This is a partial list of unnumbered minor planets for principal provisional designations assigned during 1–30 April 2004. , a total of 462 bodies remain unnumbered for this period. Objects for this year are listed on the following pages: A–B · C · D–E · F · G–H · J–O · P–Q · Ri · Rii · Riii · S · Ti · Tii · Tiii · Tiv · U–V · W–X and Y. Also see previous and next year.

G 

|- id="2004 GA" bgcolor=#FFC2E0
| 0 || 2004 GA || AMO || 20.21 || data-sort-value="0.34" | 340 m || multiple || 2004-2022 || 16 Dec 2022 || 191 || align=left | — || 
|- id="2004 GD" bgcolor=#FFC2E0
| 6 || 2004 GD || APO || 23.7 || data-sort-value="0.065" | 65 m || single || 11 days || 20 Apr 2004 || 66 || align=left | — || 
|- id="2004 GB2" bgcolor=#FFC2E0
| 5 ||  || APO || 21.0 || data-sort-value="0.22" | 220 m || single || 45 days || 23 May 2004 || 38 || align=left | Potentially hazardous object || 
|- id="2004 GC2" bgcolor=#FA8072
| – ||  || MCA || 20.5 || data-sort-value="0.33" | 330 m || single || 18 days || 30 Apr 2004 || 27 || align=left | — || 
|- id="2004 GD2" bgcolor=#FFC2E0
| 5 ||  || AMO || 24.3 || data-sort-value="0.049" | 49 m || single || 20 days || 02 May 2004 || 150 || align=left | — || 
|- id="2004 GE2" bgcolor=#FFC2E0
| 6 ||  || APO || 21.5 || data-sort-value="0.18" | 180 m || single || 12 days || 24 Apr 2004 || 93 || align=left | Potentially hazardous object || 
|- id="2004 GQ2" bgcolor=#E9E9E9
| 0 ||  || MBA-M || 17.1 || 1.6 km || multiple || 2004–2021 || 07 Jun 2021 || 162 || align=left | — || 
|- id="2004 GU2" bgcolor=#FA8072
| 0 ||  || MCA || 17.89 || data-sort-value="0.79" | 790 m || multiple || 2004–2022 || 08 Jan 2022 || 129 || align=left | Alt.: 2015 FL393 || 
|- id="2004 GZ2" bgcolor=#E9E9E9
| 0 ||  || MBA-M || 16.46 || 2.1 km || multiple || 2000–2021 || 09 Jun 2021 || 227 || align=left | Alt.: 2016 BW32 || 
|- id="2004 GB4" bgcolor=#d6d6d6
| 0 ||  || MBA-O || 16.81 || 2.4 km || multiple || 2004–2021 || 06 Oct 2021 || 174 || align=left | —Added on 22 July 2020Alt.: 2009 BC82, 2010 JQ196, 2015 MG94 || 
|- id="2004 GK4" bgcolor=#E9E9E9
| 0 ||  || MBA-M || 18.43 || data-sort-value="0.61" | 610 m || multiple || 2004–2021 || 14 Jul 2021 || 26 || align=left | — || 
|- id="2004 GL4" bgcolor=#d6d6d6
| 0 ||  || MBA-O || 16.96 || 2.3 km || multiple || 2004–2021 || 08 May 2021 || 75 || align=left | Alt.: 2015 DN125 || 
|- id="2004 GJ5" bgcolor=#FA8072
| 0 ||  || MCA || 19.2 || data-sort-value="0.43" | 430 m || multiple || 2004–2020 || 31 Jan 2020 || 66 || align=left | Alt.: 2017 ER21 || 
|- id="2004 GL5" bgcolor=#E9E9E9
| 0 ||  || MBA-M || 16.7 || 1.9 km || multiple || 2004–2021 || 12 Jan 2021 || 145 || align=left | Alt.: 2013 KB7 || 
|- id="2004 GC6" bgcolor=#d6d6d6
| 0 ||  || MBA-O || 16.71 || 2.5 km || multiple || 2000–2021 || 15 Apr 2021 || 77 || align=left | Alt.: 2010 MD61, 2017 OA30 || 
|- id="2004 GD6" bgcolor=#d6d6d6
| 0 ||  || MBA-O || 16.21 || 3.2 km || multiple || 2004–2021 || 28 Nov 2021 || 84 || align=left | Disc.: LPL/Spacewatch IIAdded on 17 January 2021Alt.: 2010 HX74 || 
|- id="2004 GG6" bgcolor=#E9E9E9
| 0 ||  || MBA-M || 17.36 || 1.9 km || multiple || 2004–2022 || 26 Jan 2022 || 118 || align=left | Alt.: 2008 AN14 || 
|- id="2004 GH6" bgcolor=#fefefe
| 0 ||  || MBA-I || 18.4 || data-sort-value="0.62" | 620 m || multiple || 2004–2020 || 16 Aug 2020 || 38 || align=left | Disc.: LPL/Spacewatch IIAdded on 19 October 2020 || 
|- id="2004 GJ6" bgcolor=#fefefe
| 0 ||  || MBA-I || 19.27 || data-sort-value="0.42" | 420 m || multiple || 2004–2021 || 09 Jul 2021 || 59 || align=left | Disc.: LPL/Spacewatch IIAdded on 17 June 2021 || 
|- id="2004 GM6" bgcolor=#E9E9E9
| 0 ||  || MBA-M || 17.5 || 1.8 km || multiple || 2004–2020 || 16 Oct 2020 || 57 || align=left | — || 
|- id="2004 GP6" bgcolor=#E9E9E9
| 0 ||  || MBA-M || 17.2 || 1.5 km || multiple || 2004–2021 || 17 Jan 2021 || 95 || align=left | Alt.: 2014 OJ376, 2015 XK199 || 
|- id="2004 GT6" bgcolor=#fefefe
| 0 ||  || MBA-I || 19.00 || data-sort-value="0.47" | 470 m || multiple || 2004–2022 || 26 Jan 2022 || 42 || align=left | Alt.: 2015 FU41 || 
|- id="2004 GV6" bgcolor=#d6d6d6
| 0 ||  || MBA-O || 16.5 || 2.8 km || multiple || 2004–2020 || 04 Jan 2020 || 118 || align=left | Alt.: 2015 CB32 || 
|- id="2004 GY6" bgcolor=#d6d6d6
| 0 ||  || MBA-O || 16.5 || 2.8 km || multiple || 2004–2021 || 13 Jun 2021 || 127 || align=left | — || 
|- id="2004 GB7" bgcolor=#d6d6d6
| 0 ||  || MBA-O || 17.7 || 1.6 km || multiple || 2004–2021 || 08 Jun 2021 || 35 || align=left | —Added on 22 July 2020Alt.: 2015 FK318 || 
|- id="2004 GD7" bgcolor=#E9E9E9
| 1 ||  || MBA-M || 17.8 || data-sort-value="0.82" | 820 m || multiple || 2004–2021 || 12 Jun 2021 || 102 || align=left | — || 
|- id="2004 GJ7" bgcolor=#E9E9E9
| 0 ||  || MBA-M || 17.4 || 1.8 km || multiple || 2004–2020 || 11 Dec 2020 || 78 || align=left | — || 
|- id="2004 GQ8" bgcolor=#E9E9E9
| 0 ||  || MBA-M || 18.0 || 1.1 km || multiple || 2004–2021 || 03 May 2021 || 48 || align=left | Alt.: 2008 DN24, 2021 EX22 || 
|- id="2004 GN9" bgcolor=#E9E9E9
| 0 ||  || MBA-M || 17.3 || 1.9 km || multiple || 2004–2020 || 07 Dec 2020 || 92 || align=left | Alt.: 2015 TL248 || 
|- id="2004 GJ10" bgcolor=#fefefe
| 0 ||  || MBA-I || 18.5 || data-sort-value="0.59" | 590 m || multiple || 2004–2020 || 13 Sep 2020 || 33 || align=left | Alt.: 2015 BA486 || 
|- id="2004 GK10" bgcolor=#d6d6d6
| 0 ||  || MBA-O || 16.4 || 2.9 km || multiple || 2004–2021 || 09 Jun 2021 || 45 || align=left | — || 
|- id="2004 GK11" bgcolor=#FA8072
| 0 ||  || MCA || 17.75 || 1.2 km || multiple || 2004–2021 || 18 May 2021 || 110 || align=left | — || 
|- id="2004 GS11" bgcolor=#E9E9E9
| 0 ||  || MBA-M || 16.41 || 1.6 km || multiple || 2000–2021 || 05 Jul 2021 || 251 || align=left | — || 
|- id="2004 GZ14" bgcolor=#FFC2E0
| 7 ||  || APO || 23.9 || data-sort-value="0.059" | 59 m || single || 8 days || 21 Apr 2004 || 58 || align=left | — || 
|- id="2004 GW17" bgcolor=#E9E9E9
| 0 ||  || MBA-M || 17.54 || 1.3 km || multiple || 2002–2021 || 07 Apr 2021 || 127 || align=left | — || 
|- id="2004 GW18" bgcolor=#FA8072
| 0 ||  || HUN || 18.6 || data-sort-value="0.57" | 570 m || multiple || 2004–2021 || 17 Jan 2021 || 122 || align=left | Alt.: 2014 GN34 || 
|- id="2004 GB19" bgcolor=#FFC2E0
| 6 ||  || APO || 23.0 || data-sort-value="0.089" | 89 m || single || 21 days || 06 May 2004 || 50 || align=left | — || 
|- id="2004 GC19" bgcolor=#FFC2E0
| 6 ||  || APO || 24.1 || data-sort-value="0.054" | 54 m || single || 10 days || 25 Apr 2004 || 47 || align=left | — || 
|- id="2004 GE19" bgcolor=#fefefe
| 1 ||  || HUN || 18.4 || data-sort-value="0.62" | 620 m || multiple || 2004–2020 || 15 Sep 2020 || 32 || align=left | Disc.: SpacewatchAdded on 29 January 2022 || 
|- id="2004 GF19" bgcolor=#fefefe
| 2 ||  || HUN || 18.4 || data-sort-value="0.62" | 620 m || multiple || 2004–2020 || 21 Nov 2020 || 73 || align=left | Alt.: 2014 EV48, 2019 EK1 || 
|- id="2004 GG22" bgcolor=#fefefe
| 0 ||  || MBA-I || 18.0 || data-sort-value="0.75" | 750 m || multiple || 2001–2020 || 15 Oct 2020 || 64 || align=left | Alt.: 2015 CK44 || 
|- id="2004 GS23" bgcolor=#E9E9E9
| 0 ||  || MBA-M || 17.1 || 1.6 km || multiple || 2000–2021 || 09 Jun 2021 || 173 || align=left | — || 
|- id="2004 GO25" bgcolor=#E9E9E9
| 0 ||  || MBA-M || 17.8 || 1.5 km || multiple || 2004–2020 || 17 Nov 2020 || 58 || align=left | — || 
|- id="2004 GY27" bgcolor=#FA8072
| 4 ||  || MCA || 18.7 || 1.0 km || single || 84 days || 08 Jun 2004 || 31 || align=left | — || 
|- id="2004 GD30" bgcolor=#fefefe
| 0 ||  || MBA-I || 18.1 || data-sort-value="0.71" | 710 m || multiple || 2004–2021 || 22 Jan 2021 || 100 || align=left | Alt.: 2011 EW78, 2011 GD73 || 
|- id="2004 GZ30" bgcolor=#d6d6d6
| 0 ||  || MBA-O || 16.4 || 2.9 km || multiple || 2004–2020 || 17 Jun 2020 || 156 || align=left | — || 
|- id="2004 GE35" bgcolor=#E9E9E9
| 0 ||  || MBA-M || 16.9 || 1.2 km || multiple || 2001–2020 || 27 Jan 2020 || 117 || align=left | Alt.: 2016 CT49 || 
|- id="2004 GJ35" bgcolor=#E9E9E9
| 0 ||  || MBA-M || 17.79 || 1.2 km || multiple || 2004–2021 || 17 Feb 2021 || 72 || align=left | — || 
|- id="2004 GB39" bgcolor=#d6d6d6
| 1 ||  || MBA-O || 16.6 || 2.7 km || multiple || 2004–2021 || 10 Mar 2021 || 49 || align=left | Alt.: 2020 YR8 || 
|- id="2004 GH44" bgcolor=#fefefe
| 0 ||  || MBA-I || 18.9 || data-sort-value="0.49" | 490 m || multiple || 2004–2021 || 18 Jan 2021 || 51 || align=left | — || 
|- id="2004 GW44" bgcolor=#E9E9E9
| 0 ||  || MBA-M || 17.1 || 1.6 km || multiple || 2004–2021 || 19 Jan 2021 || 98 || align=left | — || 
|- id="2004 GP45" bgcolor=#d6d6d6
| 0 ||  || MBA-O || 17.4 || 1.8 km || multiple || 2004–2018 || 23 Jan 2018 || 30 || align=left | — || 
|- id="2004 GR45" bgcolor=#fefefe
| 0 ||  || MBA-I || 18.58 || data-sort-value="0.57" | 570 m || multiple || 2001–2020 || 13 Sep 2020 || 39 || align=left | — || 
|- id="2004 GA46" bgcolor=#E9E9E9
| 3 ||  || MBA-M || 17.2 || 1.1 km || multiple || 2004–2020 || 17 Apr 2020 || 33 || align=left | Alt.: 2008 GN126 || 
|- id="2004 GA47" bgcolor=#E9E9E9
| – ||  || MBA-M || 19.6 || data-sort-value="0.51" | 510 m || single || 13 days || 25 Apr 2004 || 9 || align=left | — || 
|- id="2004 GQ47" bgcolor=#fefefe
| 0 ||  || MBA-I || 18.81 || data-sort-value="0.51" | 510 m || multiple || 2004–2022 || 13 Jan 2022 || 46 || align=left | — || 
|- id="2004 GR47" bgcolor=#d6d6d6
| 2 ||  || MBA-O || 17.2 || 2.0 km || multiple || 2004–2021 || 11 May 2021 || 47 || align=left | Disc.: SpacewatchAdded on 11 May 2021Alt.: 2021 EM21 || 
|- id="2004 GZ47" bgcolor=#d6d6d6
| 0 ||  || MBA-O || 16.70 || 2.5 km || multiple || 1995–2021 || 03 Aug 2021 || 160 || align=left | — || 
|- id="2004 GE48" bgcolor=#E9E9E9
| 0 ||  || MBA-M || 16.9 || 1.8 km || multiple || 2004–2021 || 14 Jun 2021 || 89 || align=left | — || 
|- id="2004 GZ48" bgcolor=#fefefe
| – ||  || MBA-I || 18.9 || data-sort-value="0.49" | 490 m || single || 13 days || 25 Apr 2004 || 9 || align=left | — || 
|- id="2004 GM49" bgcolor=#E9E9E9
| 0 ||  || MBA-M || 17.45 || 1.4 km || multiple || 2004–2021 || 12 May 2021 || 96 || align=left | — || 
|- id="2004 GR49" bgcolor=#E9E9E9
| – ||  || MBA-M || 18.6 || data-sort-value="0.80" | 800 m || single || 13 days || 25 Apr 2004 || 9 || align=left | — || 
|- id="2004 GU49" bgcolor=#d6d6d6
| 0 ||  || MBA-O || 17.00 || 2.2 km || multiple || 1999–2021 || 30 Nov 2021 || 166 || align=left | Alt.: 2006 SV86 || 
|- id="2004 GA50" bgcolor=#d6d6d6
| 0 ||  || MBA-O || 16.7 || 2.5 km || multiple || 1995–2020 || 22 Mar 2020 || 61 || align=left | —Added on 22 July 2020 || 
|- id="2004 GU50" bgcolor=#E9E9E9
| 0 ||  || MBA-M || 17.37 || 1.4 km || multiple || 2004–2021 || 13 Apr 2021 || 94 || align=left | Alt.: 2014 WL348, 2016 CN234 || 
|- id="2004 GY50" bgcolor=#d6d6d6
| 0 ||  || MBA-O || 17.00 || 2.2 km || multiple || 2004–2021 || 12 Aug 2021 || 85 || align=left | Alt.: 2016 PE26 || 
|- id="2004 GC51" bgcolor=#d6d6d6
| 0 ||  || MBA-O || 17.23 || 2.0 km || multiple || 2004–2021 || 11 Jun 2021 || 79 || align=left | —Added on 22 July 2020 || 
|- id="2004 GJ51" bgcolor=#d6d6d6
| 0 ||  || MBA-O || 16.98 || 2.2 km || multiple || 2004–2021 || 14 May 2021 || 60 || align=left | — || 
|- id="2004 GR51" bgcolor=#E9E9E9
| 0 ||  || MBA-M || 18.27 || data-sort-value="0.93" | 930 m || multiple || 2004–2021 || 19 Mar 2021 || 26 || align=left | Disc.: SpacewatchAdded on 21 August 2021 || 
|- id="2004 GB52" bgcolor=#fefefe
| 1 ||  || MBA-I || 18.7 || data-sort-value="0.54" | 540 m || multiple || 2004–2019 || 24 Aug 2019 || 30 || align=left | — || 
|- id="2004 GP52" bgcolor=#E9E9E9
| 3 ||  || MBA-M || 18.0 || 1.1 km || multiple || 2004–2017 || 27 Mar 2017 || 19 || align=left | Disc.: SpacewatchAdded on 21 August 2021 || 
|- id="2004 GB53" bgcolor=#fefefe
| 1 ||  || MBA-I || 18.6 || data-sort-value="0.57" | 570 m || multiple || 2004–2021 || 18 Feb 2021 || 34 || align=left | Disc.: SpacewatchAdded on 9 March 2021 || 
|- id="2004 GC53" bgcolor=#E9E9E9
| 2 ||  || MBA-M || 18.5 || data-sort-value="0.84" | 840 m || multiple || 2004–2021 || 09 Apr 2021 || 31 || align=left | — || 
|- id="2004 GH53" bgcolor=#fefefe
| 0 ||  || MBA-I || 18.55 || data-sort-value="0.58" | 580 m || multiple || 2004–2021 || 01 Jul 2021 || 67 || align=left | Disc.: SpacewatchAdded on 21 August 2021Alt.: 2014 GR || 
|- id="2004 GL53" bgcolor=#fefefe
| 0 ||  || MBA-I || 18.1 || data-sort-value="0.71" | 710 m || multiple || 2000–2019 || 22 Aug 2019 || 80 || align=left | — || 
|- id="2004 GR53" bgcolor=#E9E9E9
| 2 ||  || MBA-M || 18.3 || data-sort-value="0.92" | 920 m || multiple || 2004–2021 || 04 May 2021 || 24 || align=left | Disc.: SpacewatchAdded on 17 June 2021 || 
|- id="2004 GR54" bgcolor=#fefefe
| 5 ||  || MBA-I || 19.2 || data-sort-value="0.43" | 430 m || multiple || 2004–2015 || 17 Apr 2015 || 26 || align=left | — || 
|- id="2004 GS54" bgcolor=#d6d6d6
| 0 ||  || MBA-O || 16.98 || 2.2 km || multiple || 2004–2021 || 14 May 2021 || 70 || align=left | Disc.: SpacewatchAdded on 17 January 2021Alt.: 2010 JL49 || 
|- id="2004 GK55" bgcolor=#fefefe
| 0 ||  || MBA-I || 18.9 || data-sort-value="0.49" | 490 m || multiple || 2004–2020 || 13 Sep 2020 || 34 || align=left | Alt.: 2015 BC314 || 
|- id="2004 GL55" bgcolor=#d6d6d6
| 0 ||  || MBA-O || 17.02 || 2.2 km || multiple || 2001–2021 || 28 Sep 2021 || 87 || align=left | Disc.: Spacewatch Added on 13 September 2020 || 
|- id="2004 GM55" bgcolor=#d6d6d6
| 0 ||  || MBA-O || 17.4 || 1.8 km || multiple || 2004–2020 || 02 Apr 2020 || 43 || align=left | Disc.: Spacewatch Added on 22 July 2020 || 
|- id="2004 GN55" bgcolor=#fefefe
| 0 ||  || MBA-I || 18.44 || data-sort-value="0.61" | 610 m || multiple || 2004–2021 || 31 Oct 2021 || 50 || align=left | Disc.: Spacewatch Added on 13 September 2020Alt.: 2015 BJ473 || 
|- id="2004 GO55" bgcolor=#E9E9E9
| 0 ||  || MBA-M || 17.32 || 1.4 km || multiple || 2004–2021 || 10 May 2021 || 140 || align=left | — || 
|- id="2004 GR55" bgcolor=#E9E9E9
| 0 ||  || MBA-M || 17.5 || 1.3 km || multiple || 2004–2021 || 16 Jan 2021 || 63 || align=left | Alt.: 2008 EO56, 2014 SQ32 || 
|- id="2004 GP56" bgcolor=#d6d6d6
| 0 ||  || MBA-O || 16.80 || 2.4 km || multiple || 2004–2021 || 13 May 2021 || 63 || align=left | — || 
|- id="2004 GR56" bgcolor=#E9E9E9
| 0 ||  || MBA-M || 18.33 || data-sort-value="0.91" | 910 m || multiple || 2004–2021 || 10 Apr 2021 || 79 || align=left | Alt.: 2016 AC91 || 
|- id="2004 GA58" bgcolor=#fefefe
| 0 ||  || MBA-I || 19.2 || data-sort-value="0.43" | 430 m || multiple || 2004–2020 || 27 Jan 2020 || 34 || align=left | — || 
|- id="2004 GK58" bgcolor=#FA8072
| 1 ||  || HUN || 18.7 || data-sort-value="0.54" | 540 m || multiple || 2004–2019 || 07 Apr 2019 || 47 || align=left | Alt.: 2014 ET48 || 
|- id="2004 GN58" bgcolor=#E9E9E9
| 2 ||  || MBA-M || 18.3 || data-sort-value="0.92" | 920 m || multiple || 2004–2021 || 03 May 2021 || 34 || align=left | Disc.:  LPL/Spacewatch IIAdded on 11 May 2021Alt.: 2021 FR19 || 
|- id="2004 GX59" bgcolor=#d6d6d6
| 4 ||  || MBA-O || 17.1 || 2.1 km || multiple || 2004–2018 || 25 Jan 2018 || 20 || align=left | — || 
|- id="2004 GH61" bgcolor=#E9E9E9
| 0 ||  || MBA-M || 17.5 || 1.3 km || multiple || 2004–2021 || 04 Jan 2021 || 58 || align=left | — || 
|- id="2004 GQ61" bgcolor=#fefefe
| 0 ||  || MBA-I || 18.1 || data-sort-value="0.71" | 710 m || multiple || 2004–2019 || 19 Nov 2019 || 71 || align=left | Alt.: 2015 OT31 || 
|- id="2004 GX61" bgcolor=#E9E9E9
| 0 ||  || MBA-M || 17.4 || 1.4 km || multiple || 2004–2021 || 18 Jan 2021 || 52 || align=left | — || 
|- id="2004 GY61" bgcolor=#E9E9E9
| 0 ||  || MBA-M || 17.2 || 2.0 km || multiple || 2004–2020 || 15 Dec 2020 || 105 || align=left | Alt.: 2017 BX127 || 
|- id="2004 GZ61" bgcolor=#E9E9E9
| 0 ||  || MBA-M || 17.62 || 1.3 km || multiple || 2001–2021 || 09 Apr 2021 || 77 || align=left | Alt.: 2014 SP258 || 
|- id="2004 GA62" bgcolor=#fefefe
| 0 ||  || MBA-I || 18.2 || data-sort-value="0.68" | 680 m || multiple || 2004–2021 || 18 Jan 2021 || 226 || align=left | Alt.: 2009 RZ23 || 
|- id="2004 GD62" bgcolor=#fefefe
| 0 ||  || MBA-I || 18.59 || data-sort-value="0.57" | 570 m || multiple || 2004–2021 || 12 Nov 2021 || 57 || align=left | — || 
|- id="2004 GF62" bgcolor=#d6d6d6
| 0 ||  || MBA-O || 17.02 || 2.2 km || multiple || 2004–2021 || 09 Jul 2021 || 100 || align=left | Alt.: 2017 RC96 || 
|- id="2004 GL62" bgcolor=#fefefe
| 0 ||  || MBA-I || 18.4 || data-sort-value="0.62" | 620 m || multiple || 1994–2021 || 05 Jun 2021 || 116 || align=left | — || 
|- id="2004 GP62" bgcolor=#E9E9E9
| 1 ||  || MBA-M || 18.3 || data-sort-value="0.92" | 920 m || multiple || 2004–2021 || 14 May 2021 || 39 || align=left | Disc.: SpacewatchAdded on 21 August 2021Alt.: 2017 MG20 || 
|- id="2004 GQ63" bgcolor=#d6d6d6
| 0 ||  || MBA-O || 16.7 || 2.5 km || multiple || 2004–2020 || 11 Apr 2020 || 74 || align=left | — || 
|- id="2004 GV63" bgcolor=#fefefe
| 0 ||  || MBA-I || 18.1 || data-sort-value="0.71" | 710 m || multiple || 1998–2020 || 07 Dec 2020 || 47 || align=left | Alt.: 2015 JC6 || 
|- id="2004 GQ64" bgcolor=#E9E9E9
| 0 ||  || MBA-M || 17.09 || 1.6 km || multiple || 2004–2021 || 06 Apr 2021 || 135 || align=left | — || 
|- id="2004 GT64" bgcolor=#fefefe
| 1 ||  || MBA-I || 18.5 || data-sort-value="0.59" | 590 m || multiple || 2004–2019 || 26 Sep 2019 || 40 || align=left | — || 
|- id="2004 GZ64" bgcolor=#d6d6d6
| 0 ||  || MBA-O || 16.79 || 2.4 km || multiple || 2004–2021 || 05 Jul 2021 || 99 || align=left | Alt.: 2015 FS391 || 
|- id="2004 GA65" bgcolor=#d6d6d6
| 0 ||  || MBA-O || 17.24 || 2.0 km || multiple || 2004–2021 || 11 Aug 2021 || 53 || align=left | —Added on 22 July 2020 || 
|- id="2004 GC65" bgcolor=#fefefe
| 0 ||  || MBA-I || 18.1 || data-sort-value="0.71" | 710 m || multiple || 2004–2019 || 28 Aug 2019 || 60 || align=left | — || 
|- id="2004 GD65" bgcolor=#E9E9E9
| 0 ||  || MBA-M || 16.7 || 1.9 km || multiple || 2004–2021 || 16 Jan 2021 || 207 || align=left | Alt.: 2017 EG5 || 
|- id="2004 GW65" bgcolor=#E9E9E9
| 0 ||  || MBA-M || 17.9 || 1.1 km || multiple || 2004–2021 || 07 Feb 2021 || 36 || align=left | Disc.: SpacewatchAdded on 11 May 2021 || 
|- id="2004 GC66" bgcolor=#E9E9E9
| 0 ||  || MBA-M || 16.97 || 1.2 km || multiple || 2001–2021 || 16 May 2021 || 55 || align=left | Alt.: 2008 EA107, 2016 CD233 || 
|- id="2004 GS66" bgcolor=#E9E9E9
| 0 ||  || MBA-M || 17.47 || 1.3 km || multiple || 2001–2021 || 07 Apr 2021 || 128 || align=left | Alt.: 2010 UZ19, 2014 QD353 || 
|- id="2004 GW66" bgcolor=#E9E9E9
| 0 ||  || MBA-M || 17.8 || 1.5 km || multiple || 2000–2019 || 27 Oct 2019 || 49 || align=left | — || 
|- id="2004 GK67" bgcolor=#E9E9E9
| 1 ||  || MBA-M || 17.5 || 1.3 km || multiple || 2004–2021 || 16 May 2021 || 44 || align=left | Disc.: SpacewatchAdded on 11 May 2021 || 
|- id="2004 GO67" bgcolor=#d6d6d6
| 0 ||  || MBA-O || 16.2 || 3.2 km || multiple || 2001–2021 || 07 Jun 2021 || 85 || align=left | Alt.: 2015 GA9 || 
|- id="2004 GQ67" bgcolor=#E9E9E9
| 0 ||  || MBA-M || 16.9 || 2.3 km || multiple || 2004–2021 || 09 Jan 2021 || 76 || align=left | — || 
|- id="2004 GB68" bgcolor=#fefefe
| 0 ||  || MBA-I || 18.6 || data-sort-value="0.57" | 570 m || multiple || 2004–2021 || 16 Jan 2021 || 79 || align=left | —Added on 22 July 2020Alt.: 2018 FV24 || 
|- id="2004 GE68" bgcolor=#E9E9E9
| 0 ||  || MBA-M || 17.9 || 1.5 km || multiple || 2004–2018 || 07 Aug 2018 || 38 || align=left | — || 
|- id="2004 GG68" bgcolor=#E9E9E9
| 0 ||  || MBA-M || 17.6 || data-sort-value="0.90" | 900 m || multiple || 2004–2020 || 16 Feb 2020 || 50 || align=left | —Added on 22 July 2020 || 
|- id="2004 GO68" bgcolor=#fefefe
| 0 ||  || MBA-I || 18.2 || data-sort-value="0.68" | 680 m || multiple || 2004–2020 || 19 Nov 2020 || 73 || align=left | — || 
|- id="2004 GT68" bgcolor=#d6d6d6
| 0 ||  || MBA-O || 16.5 || 2.8 km || multiple || 2004–2020 || 25 May 2020 || 109 || align=left | — || 
|- id="2004 GZ68" bgcolor=#E9E9E9
| 0 ||  || MBA-M || 16.93 || 1.7 km || multiple || 2004–2021 || 10 Jun 2021 || 152 || align=left | — || 
|- id="2004 GG69" bgcolor=#fefefe
| 0 ||  || MBA-I || 17.5 || data-sort-value="0.94" | 940 m || multiple || 2004–2020 || 14 Dec 2020 || 119 || align=left | — || 
|- id="2004 GF70" bgcolor=#E9E9E9
| 3 ||  || MBA-M || 18.2 || data-sort-value="0.96" | 960 m || multiple || 2004–2017 || 26 Apr 2017 || 16 || align=left | — || 
|- id="2004 GR72" bgcolor=#fefefe
| 0 ||  || MBA-I || 17.9 || data-sort-value="0.78" | 780 m || multiple || 2004–2021 || 08 Jan 2021 || 105 || align=left | Alt.: 2006 XM48 || 
|- id="2004 GQ73" bgcolor=#E9E9E9
| 0 ||  || MBA-M || 17.09 || 2.1 km || multiple || 2004–2022 || 27 Jan 2022 || 79 || align=left | — || 
|- id="2004 GS74" bgcolor=#E9E9E9
| 0 ||  || MBA-M || 17.33 || 1.4 km || multiple || 2004–2021 || 18 May 2021 || 135 || align=left | Alt.: 2010 VZ66 || 
|- id="2004 GZ75" bgcolor=#d6d6d6
| 0 ||  || MBA-O || 16.3 || 3.1 km || multiple || 2001–2021 || 20 Apr 2021 || 72 || align=left | Disc.: SpacewatchAdded on 11 May 2021Alt.: 2010 CM231, 2010 OQ56 || 
|- id="2004 GG76" bgcolor=#fefefe
| 0 ||  || MBA-I || 18.2 || data-sort-value="0.68" | 680 m || multiple || 2004–2021 || 17 Jan 2021 || 90 || align=left | Alt.: 2011 GT10 || 
|- id="2004 GK76" bgcolor=#fefefe
| 1 ||  || MBA-I || 17.8 || data-sort-value="0.82" | 820 m || multiple || 2004–2019 || 26 Sep 2019 || 64 || align=left | — || 
|- id="2004 GM78" bgcolor=#d6d6d6
| 0 ||  || MBA-O || 16.8 || 2.4 km || multiple || 2004–2021 || 02 Jun 2021 || 56 || align=left | — || 
|- id="2004 GS79" bgcolor=#E9E9E9
| 0 ||  || MBA-M || 17.90 || 1.1 km || multiple || 2004–2021 || 30 Apr 2021 || 99 || align=left | — || 
|- id="2004 GU79" bgcolor=#E9E9E9
| 0 ||  || MBA-M || 17.32 || 1.0 km || multiple || 1996–2021 || 30 Jul 2021 || 131 || align=left | Alt.: 2012 DQ75, 2014 WC280 || 
|- id="2004 GG80" bgcolor=#fefefe
| 0 ||  || MBA-I || 17.9 || data-sort-value="0.78" | 780 m || multiple || 2004–2020 || 16 Oct 2020 || 92 || align=left | — || 
|- id="2004 GK80" bgcolor=#fefefe
| 0 ||  || MBA-I || 18.20 || data-sort-value="0.68" | 680 m || multiple || 2004–2021 || 14 Apr 2021 || 105 || align=left | Alt.: 2011 LV12 || 
|- id="2004 GA81" bgcolor=#d6d6d6
| 0 ||  || MBA-O || 16.66 || 2.6 km || multiple || 2004–2021 || 01 May 2021 || 85 || align=left | Alt.: 2006 QA179 || 
|- id="2004 GE81" bgcolor=#fefefe
| 2 ||  || MBA-I || 18.1 || data-sort-value="0.71" | 710 m || multiple || 2004–2009 || 19 Sep 2009 || 25 || align=left | Alt.: 2008 EG139 || 
|- id="2004 GD82" bgcolor=#fefefe
| 0 ||  || MBA-I || 17.53 || data-sort-value="0.93" | 930 m || multiple || 1998–2021 || 03 May 2021 || 156 || align=left | Alt.: 2014 DZ12, 2015 PV283 || 
|- id="2004 GP82" bgcolor=#fefefe
| 0 ||  || MBA-I || 18.3 || data-sort-value="0.65" | 650 m || multiple || 2004–2019 || 01 Jul 2019 || 49 || align=left | — || 
|- id="2004 GC84" bgcolor=#E9E9E9
| 0 ||  || MBA-M || 17.3 || 1.9 km || multiple || 2004–2020 || 14 Nov 2020 || 81 || align=left | —Added on 22 July 2020Alt.: 2006 VH95 || 
|- id="2004 GJ84" bgcolor=#fefefe
| 0 ||  || MBA-I || 17.9 || data-sort-value="0.78" | 780 m || multiple || 2004–2021 || 12 Jan 2021 || 100 || align=left | Alt.: 2009 WN157, 2014 BK32 || 
|- id="2004 GL84" bgcolor=#d6d6d6
| 0 ||  || MBA-O || 16.64 || 2.6 km || multiple || 2004–2021 || 03 Jul 2021 || 111 || align=left | — || 
|- id="2004 GN84" bgcolor=#fefefe
| 0 ||  || MBA-I || 18.81 || data-sort-value="0.51" | 510 m || multiple || 2002–2021 || 15 Apr 2021 || 58 || align=left | Disc.: LPL/Spacewatch IIAdded on 11 May 2021 || 
|- id="2004 GT85" bgcolor=#d6d6d6
| 0 ||  || MBA-O || 17.36 || 1.9 km || multiple || 2004–2021 || 07 Oct 2021 || 33 || align=left | Disc.: SpacewatchAdded on 21 August 2021 || 
|- id="2004 GZ85" bgcolor=#E9E9E9
| 0 ||  || MBA-M || 17.1 || 2.1 km || multiple || 2004–2019 || 28 Oct 2019 || 55 || align=left | — || 
|- id="2004 GL86" bgcolor=#fefefe
| 0 ||  || MBA-I || 18.1 || data-sort-value="0.71" | 710 m || multiple || 2004–2020 || 10 Nov 2020 || 56 || align=left | — || 
|- id="2004 GT86" bgcolor=#E9E9E9
| 0 ||  || MBA-M || 16.7 || 2.5 km || multiple || 2004–2019 || 23 Nov 2019 || 78 || align=left | — || 
|- id="2004 GV86" bgcolor=#fefefe
| 0 ||  || MBA-I || 18.04 || data-sort-value="0.73" | 730 m || multiple || 2004–2021 || 11 May 2021 || 95 || align=left | Alt.: 2009 SG189, 2011 HW50 || 
|- id="2004 GL88" bgcolor=#fefefe
| 0 ||  || MBA-I || 17.7 || data-sort-value="0.86" | 860 m || multiple || 2002–2020 || 10 Dec 2020 || 155 || align=left | — || 
|- id="2004 GO88" bgcolor=#d6d6d6
| 0 ||  || MBA-O || 16.7 || 2.5 km || multiple || 1999–2020 || 25 Apr 2020 || 125 || align=left | Alt.: 2010 JW172 || 
|- id="2004 GS88" bgcolor=#E9E9E9
| 0 ||  || MBA-M || 17.9 || 1.5 km || multiple || 2004–2019 || 26 Sep 2019 || 27 || align=left | Disc.: VATTAdded on 17 June 2021 || 
|- id="2004 GX88" bgcolor=#E9E9E9
| 0 ||  || MBA-M || 17.46 || data-sort-value="0.96" | 960 m || multiple || 2004–2021 || 01 Oct 2021 || 49 || align=left | — || 
|- id="2004 GZ88" bgcolor=#fefefe
| 1 ||  || MBA-I || 18.4 || data-sort-value="0.62" | 620 m || multiple || 2004–2019 || 27 Jan 2019 || 35 || align=left | — || 
|- id="2004 GA89" bgcolor=#E9E9E9
| 0 ||  || MBA-M || 16.64 || 1.4 km || multiple || 2000–2021 || 06 May 2021 || 273 || align=left | Alt.: 2013 HM10 || 
|- id="2004 GF89" bgcolor=#fefefe
| 0 ||  || MBA-I || 17.1 || 1.1 km || multiple || 2004–2021 || 05 Jan 2021 || 219 || align=left | — || 
|- id="2004 GH89" bgcolor=#fefefe
| 0 ||  || MBA-I || 18.0 || data-sort-value="0.75" | 750 m || multiple || 2004–2020 || 09 Dec 2020 || 81 || align=left | — || 
|- id="2004 GK89" bgcolor=#d6d6d6
| 0 ||  || MBA-O || 17.1 || 2.1 km || multiple || 2004–2020 || 16 Oct 2020 || 124 || align=left | — || 
|- id="2004 GL89" bgcolor=#fefefe
| 0 ||  || MBA-I || 18.37 || data-sort-value="0.63" | 630 m || multiple || 2004–2021 || 30 Nov 2021 || 109 || align=left | — || 
|- id="2004 GM89" bgcolor=#E9E9E9
| 0 ||  || MBA-M || 17.24 || 1.5 km || multiple || 2004–2021 || 18 May 2021 || 114 || align=left | — || 
|- id="2004 GN89" bgcolor=#d6d6d6
| 0 ||  || MBA-O || 17.14 || 2.1 km || multiple || 2004–2021 || 08 Sep 2021 || 84 || align=left | — || 
|- id="2004 GO89" bgcolor=#E9E9E9
| 0 ||  || MBA-M || 17.17 || 1.5 km || multiple || 2004–2021 || 07 May 2021 || 122 || align=left | — || 
|- id="2004 GP89" bgcolor=#E9E9E9
| 0 ||  || MBA-M || 17.49 || 1.3 km || multiple || 2004–2021 || 03 Apr 2021 || 75 || align=left | — || 
|- id="2004 GR89" bgcolor=#fefefe
| 0 ||  || MBA-I || 17.1 || 1.1 km || multiple || 2004–2021 || 12 Jan 2021 || 80 || align=left | — || 
|- id="2004 GS89" bgcolor=#d6d6d6
| 0 ||  || MBA-O || 17.0 || 2.2 km || multiple || 2004–2020 || 26 Apr 2020 || 63 || align=left | — || 
|- id="2004 GT89" bgcolor=#fefefe
| 0 ||  || MBA-I || 18.5 || data-sort-value="0.59" | 590 m || multiple || 2004–2021 || 07 Jun 2021 || 87 || align=left | — || 
|- id="2004 GU89" bgcolor=#fefefe
| 0 ||  || MBA-I || 18.2 || data-sort-value="0.68" | 680 m || multiple || 2004–2021 || 18 Jan 2021 || 121 || align=left | — || 
|- id="2004 GW89" bgcolor=#E9E9E9
| 0 ||  || MBA-M || 17.3 || 1.9 km || multiple || 2004–2020 || 15 Dec 2020 || 77 || align=left | — || 
|- id="2004 GY89" bgcolor=#fefefe
| 0 ||  || MBA-I || 18.7 || data-sort-value="0.54" | 540 m || multiple || 2004–2018 || 20 Jan 2018 || 47 || align=left | — || 
|- id="2004 GZ89" bgcolor=#d6d6d6
| 0 ||  || MBA-O || 16.60 || 2.7 km || multiple || 2004–2021 || 12 May 2021 || 108 || align=left | — || 
|- id="2004 GA90" bgcolor=#fefefe
| 0 ||  || MBA-I || 18.0 || data-sort-value="0.75" | 750 m || multiple || 2004–2021 || 09 Jan 2021 || 76 || align=left | — || 
|- id="2004 GB90" bgcolor=#E9E9E9
| 0 ||  || MBA-M || 17.6 || 1.3 km || multiple || 2004–2019 || 04 Dec 2019 || 64 || align=left | — || 
|- id="2004 GC90" bgcolor=#E9E9E9
| 0 ||  || MBA-M || 17.7 || 1.2 km || multiple || 2004–2019 || 28 Nov 2019 || 53 || align=left | — || 
|- id="2004 GD90" bgcolor=#d6d6d6
| 0 ||  || MBA-O || 16.4 || 2.9 km || multiple || 2004–2018 || 05 Nov 2018 || 54 || align=left | Alt.: 2006 UF287 || 
|- id="2004 GE90" bgcolor=#E9E9E9
| 0 ||  || MBA-M || 16.7 || 1.9 km || multiple || 2004–2021 || 12 Jun 2021 || 107 || align=left | — || 
|- id="2004 GF90" bgcolor=#d6d6d6
| 0 ||  || MBA-O || 16.9 || 2.3 km || multiple || 2004–2020 || 27 Apr 2020 || 49 || align=left | — || 
|- id="2004 GG90" bgcolor=#d6d6d6
| 0 ||  || MBA-O || 16.93 || 2.3 km || multiple || 2004–2021 || 04 Apr 2021 || 52 || align=left | — || 
|- id="2004 GH90" bgcolor=#fefefe
| 0 ||  || MBA-I || 18.61 || data-sort-value="0.56" | 560 m || multiple || 2004–2021 || 07 Sep 2021 || 57 || align=left | — || 
|- id="2004 GJ90" bgcolor=#d6d6d6
| 1 ||  || MBA-O || 17.4 || 1.8 km || multiple || 2004–2019 || 07 Apr 2019 || 58 || align=left | — || 
|- id="2004 GK90" bgcolor=#d6d6d6
| 0 ||  || MBA-O || 16.2 || 3.2 km || multiple || 2004–2020 || 12 Jun 2020 || 101 || align=left | — || 
|- id="2004 GL90" bgcolor=#FA8072
| 1 ||  || MCA || 18.7 || data-sort-value="0.54" | 540 m || multiple || 2004–2020 || 21 May 2020 || 54 || align=left | Alt.: 2010 CF274 || 
|- id="2004 GM90" bgcolor=#fefefe
| 0 ||  || MBA-I || 18.5 || data-sort-value="0.59" | 590 m || multiple || 2004–2019 || 02 Sep 2019 || 140 || align=left | — || 
|- id="2004 GN90" bgcolor=#fefefe
| 0 ||  || MBA-I || 18.5 || data-sort-value="0.59" | 590 m || multiple || 2004–2018 || 20 Jan 2018 || 35 || align=left | — || 
|- id="2004 GP90" bgcolor=#E9E9E9
| 0 ||  || MBA-M || 17.0 || 1.7 km || multiple || 2004–2021 || 13 Jun 2021 || 137 || align=left | — || 
|- id="2004 GQ90" bgcolor=#fefefe
| 0 ||  || MBA-I || 17.9 || data-sort-value="0.78" | 780 m || multiple || 2004–2020 || 23 Dec 2020 || 47 || align=left | — || 
|- id="2004 GR90" bgcolor=#E9E9E9
| 1 ||  || MBA-M || 17.7 || 1.2 km || multiple || 2004–2017 || 27 Mar 2017 || 30 || align=left | — || 
|- id="2004 GS90" bgcolor=#d6d6d6
| 0 ||  || MBA-O || 17.14 || 2.1 km || multiple || 2004–2021 || 09 Aug 2021 || 43 || align=left | — || 
|- id="2004 GT90" bgcolor=#d6d6d6
| 0 ||  || MBA-O || 16.6 || 2.7 km || multiple || 2004–2020 || 02 Apr 2020 || 42 || align=left | Alt.: 2010 EC154 || 
|- id="2004 GV90" bgcolor=#d6d6d6
| 0 ||  || MBA-O || 16.2 || 3.2 km || multiple || 2004–2020 || 25 May 2020 || 123 || align=left | — || 
|- id="2004 GW90" bgcolor=#E9E9E9
| 0 ||  || MBA-M || 17.66 || 1.2 km || multiple || 2004–2021 || 03 May 2021 || 104 || align=left | — || 
|- id="2004 GX90" bgcolor=#fefefe
| 0 ||  || MBA-I || 18.32 || data-sort-value="0.64" | 640 m || multiple || 2004–2021 || 11 Jun 2021 || 105 || align=left | — || 
|- id="2004 GY90" bgcolor=#fefefe
| 0 ||  || MBA-I || 18.0 || data-sort-value="0.75" | 750 m || multiple || 2004–2021 || 15 Jun 2021 || 97 || align=left | — || 
|- id="2004 GZ90" bgcolor=#d6d6d6
| 0 ||  || MBA-O || 16.5 || 2.8 km || multiple || 2004–2020 || 30 Apr 2020 || 81 || align=left | — || 
|- id="2004 GA91" bgcolor=#fefefe
| 0 ||  || MBA-I || 17.6 || data-sort-value="0.90" | 900 m || multiple || 2004–2021 || 17 Jan 2021 || 83 || align=left | — || 
|- id="2004 GB91" bgcolor=#d6d6d6
| 0 ||  || MBA-O || 16.82 || 2.4 km || multiple || 2000–2021 || 28 Sep 2021 || 84 || align=left | — || 
|- id="2004 GC91" bgcolor=#fefefe
| 0 ||  || MBA-I || 18.3 || data-sort-value="0.65" | 650 m || multiple || 2004–2019 || 24 Aug 2019 || 53 || align=left | — || 
|- id="2004 GD91" bgcolor=#fefefe
| 0 ||  || MBA-I || 18.30 || data-sort-value="0.65" | 650 m || multiple || 2004–2021 || 03 Apr 2021 || 73 || align=left | — || 
|- id="2004 GE91" bgcolor=#fefefe
| 0 ||  || MBA-I || 18.09 || data-sort-value="0.72" | 720 m || multiple || 2004–2022 || 05 Jan 2022 || 86 || align=left | — || 
|- id="2004 GF91" bgcolor=#fefefe
| 0 ||  || MBA-I || 18.3 || data-sort-value="0.65" | 650 m || multiple || 2004–2019 || 24 Oct 2019 || 53 || align=left | — || 
|- id="2004 GG91" bgcolor=#fefefe
| 0 ||  || MBA-I || 18.5 || data-sort-value="0.59" | 590 m || multiple || 2004–2019 || 27 Oct 2019 || 42 || align=left | — || 
|- id="2004 GJ91" bgcolor=#E9E9E9
| 0 ||  || MBA-M || 17.8 || 1.5 km || multiple || 2004–2019 || 23 Sep 2019 || 41 || align=left | — || 
|- id="2004 GK91" bgcolor=#d6d6d6
| 0 ||  || MBA-O || 16.9 || 2.3 km || multiple || 2004–2020 || 27 Apr 2020 || 58 || align=left | — || 
|- id="2004 GL91" bgcolor=#d6d6d6
| 0 ||  || MBA-O || 17.1 || 2.1 km || multiple || 2004–2020 || 18 Sep 2020 || 44 || align=left | — || 
|- id="2004 GM91" bgcolor=#E9E9E9
| 0 ||  || MBA-M || 17.57 || 1.3 km || multiple || 2004–2021 || 20 May 2021 || 73 || align=left | — || 
|- id="2004 GN91" bgcolor=#d6d6d6
| 0 ||  || MBA-O || 16.8 || 2.4 km || multiple || 2004–2020 || 27 Apr 2020 || 149 || align=left | — || 
|- id="2004 GO91" bgcolor=#fefefe
| 0 ||  || MBA-I || 17.9 || data-sort-value="0.78" | 780 m || multiple || 2004–2020 || 09 Dec 2020 || 91 || align=left | — || 
|- id="2004 GR91" bgcolor=#d6d6d6
| 0 ||  || MBA-O || 17.4 || 1.8 km || multiple || 2004–2020 || 10 Oct 2020 || 90 || align=left | — || 
|- id="2004 GS91" bgcolor=#E9E9E9
| 0 ||  || MBA-M || 17.52 || 1.7 km || multiple || 2004–2022 || 06 Jan 2022 || 52 || align=left | — || 
|- id="2004 GT91" bgcolor=#E9E9E9
| 0 ||  || MBA-M || 17.5 || data-sort-value="0.94" | 940 m || multiple || 2004–2020 || 24 Mar 2020 || 44 || align=left | — || 
|- id="2004 GU91" bgcolor=#fefefe
| 0 ||  || MBA-I || 18.1 || data-sort-value="0.71" | 710 m || multiple || 2004–2019 || 03 Oct 2019 || 36 || align=left | — || 
|- id="2004 GV91" bgcolor=#fefefe
| 0 ||  || MBA-I || 18.7 || data-sort-value="0.54" | 540 m || multiple || 2001–2020 || 18 Aug 2020 || 44 || align=left | — || 
|- id="2004 GW91" bgcolor=#d6d6d6
| 0 ||  || MBA-O || 15.78 || 3.9 km || multiple || 2004–2021 || 03 Jul 2021 || 104 || align=left | — || 
|- id="2004 GY91" bgcolor=#E9E9E9
| 0 ||  || MBA-M || 17.59 || data-sort-value="0.90" | 900 m || multiple || 2004–2021 || 09 Aug 2021 || 64 || align=left | — || 
|- id="2004 GZ91" bgcolor=#fefefe
| 0 ||  || MBA-I || 19.09 || data-sort-value="0.45" | 450 m || multiple || 1998–2021 || 30 Aug 2021 || 60 || align=left | — || 
|- id="2004 GA92" bgcolor=#d6d6d6
| 0 ||  || MBA-O || 17.18 || 2.0 km || multiple || 2004–2021 || 17 Jun 2021 || 38 || align=left | — || 
|- id="2004 GB92" bgcolor=#d6d6d6
| 0 ||  || MBA-O || 16.7 || 2.5 km || multiple || 2004–2020 || 21 Apr 2020 || 55 || align=left | — || 
|- id="2004 GE92" bgcolor=#fefefe
| 0 ||  || MBA-I || 18.9 || data-sort-value="0.49" | 490 m || multiple || 2004–2018 || 13 Aug 2018 || 41 || align=left | — || 
|- id="2004 GF92" bgcolor=#E9E9E9
| 2 ||  || MBA-M || 18.1 || data-sort-value="0.71" | 710 m || multiple || 2004–2020 || 24 Jan 2020 || 38 || align=left | — || 
|- id="2004 GH92" bgcolor=#E9E9E9
| 0 ||  || MBA-M || 17.16 || 1.1 km || multiple || 2004–2021 || 14 Jul 2021 || 68 || align=left | Disc.: SDSSAdded on 17 January 2021 || 
|- id="2004 GJ92" bgcolor=#E9E9E9
| 0 ||  || MBA-M || 18.38 || data-sort-value="0.89" | 890 m || multiple || 2004–2021 || 28 Jun 2021 || 83 || align=left | Disc.: NEATAdded on 11 May 2021 || 
|- id="2004 GK92" bgcolor=#E9E9E9
| 1 ||  || MBA-M || 17.82 || 1.1 km || multiple || 2004–2021 || 14 May 2021 || 30 || align=left | Disc.: SpacewatchAdded on 11 May 2021 || 
|}
back to top

H 

|- id="2004 HB" bgcolor=#FFC2E0
| 8 || 2004 HB || APO || 23.9 || data-sort-value="0.059" | 59 m || single || 2 days || 18 Apr 2004 || 21 || align=left | — || 
|- id="2004 HD" bgcolor=#FFC2E0
| 6 || 2004 HD || AMO || 24.8 || data-sort-value="0.039" | 39 m || single || 16 days || 02 May 2004 || 73 || align=left | — || 
|- id="2004 HE" bgcolor=#FFC2E0
| 6 || 2004 HE || APO || 26.8 || data-sort-value="0.016" | 16 m || single || 1 day || 17 Apr 2004 || 40 || align=left | — || 
|- id="2004 HL" bgcolor=#FFC2E0
| 6 || 2004 HL || APO || 26.5 || data-sort-value="0.018" | 18 m || single || 1 day || 17 Apr 2004 || 25 || align=left | AMO at MPC || 
|- id="2004 HM" bgcolor=#FFC2E0
| 1 || 2004 HM || APO || 23.18 || data-sort-value="0.082" | 82 m || multiple || 2004–2020 || 20 Oct 2020 || 132 || align=left | — || 
|- id="2004 HZ" bgcolor=#FFC2E0
| 3 || 2004 HZ || APO || 22.6 || data-sort-value="0.11" | 110 m || multiple || 2004–2007 || 22 Apr 2007 || 74 || align=left | — || 
|- id="2004 HA1" bgcolor=#FFC2E0
| 8 ||  || APO || 21.7 || data-sort-value="0.16" | 160 m || single || 6 days || 25 Apr 2004 || 65 || align=left | — || 
|- id="2004 HC1" bgcolor=#fefefe
| 0 ||  || MBA-I || 18.46 || data-sort-value="0.60" | 600 m || multiple || 2001–2021 || 12 May 2021 || 74 || align=left | — || 
|- id="2004 HQ1" bgcolor=#FFC2E0
| 6 ||  || APO || 23.1 || data-sort-value="0.085" | 85 m || single || 30 days || 19 May 2004 || 64 || align=left | — || 
|- id="2004 HA2" bgcolor=#FA8072
| – ||  || MCA || 20.1 || data-sort-value="0.28" | 280 m || single || 1 day || 21 Apr 2004 || 26 || align=left | — || 
|- id="2004 HD2" bgcolor=#FFC2E0
| 7 ||  || APO || 21.1 || data-sort-value="0.21" | 210 m || single || 20 days || 10 May 2004 || 53 || align=left | Potentially hazardous object || 
|- id="2004 HS3" bgcolor=#E9E9E9
| 0 ||  || MBA-M || 18.0 || 1.1 km || multiple || 2004–2019 || 27 Oct 2019 || 36 || align=left | Alt.: 2008 CX147 || 
|- id="2004 HO5" bgcolor=#E9E9E9
| 1 ||  || MBA-M || 17.2 || 2.0 km || multiple || 2004–2020 || 07 Dec 2020 || 72 || align=left | — || 
|- id="2004 HK11" bgcolor=#fefefe
| 0 ||  || MBA-I || 17.66 || data-sort-value="0.87" | 870 m || multiple || 1998–2021 || 09 Jun 2021 || 135 || align=left | Alt.: 2017 BS114 || 
|- id="2004 HV11" bgcolor=#E9E9E9
| 0 ||  || MBA-M || 17.4 || 1.4 km || multiple || 2004–2021 || 09 Jun 2021 || 91 || align=left | — || 
|- id="2004 HF12" bgcolor=#FFC2E0
| 6 ||  || APO || 20.5 || data-sort-value="0.28" | 280 m || single || 48 days || 07 Jun 2004 || 72 || align=left | Potentially hazardous object || 
|- id="2004 HG12" bgcolor=#FFC2E0
| 8 ||  || APO || 22.4 || data-sort-value="0.12" | 120 m || single || 14 days || 04 May 2004 || 53 || align=left | — || 
|- id="2004 HK12" bgcolor=#FA8072
| 0 ||  || MCA || 20.1 || data-sort-value="0.28" | 280 m || multiple || 2004–2019 || 28 Nov 2019 || 170 || align=left | — || 
|- id="2004 HY12" bgcolor=#E9E9E9
| 0 ||  || MBA-M || 17.3 || 1.5 km || multiple || 2004–2021 || 16 Jan 2021 || 95 || align=left | Alt.: 2017 DR134 || 
|- id="2004 HT13" bgcolor=#fefefe
| 0 ||  || MBA-I || 18.60 || data-sort-value="0.57" | 570 m || multiple || 2004–2021 || 18 May 2021 || 73 || align=left | Disc.: SpacewatchAdded on 11 May 2021Alt.: 2015 PG273, 2021 FP14 || 
|- id="2004 HK14" bgcolor=#fefefe
| 0 ||  || MBA-I || 18.12 || data-sort-value="0.71" | 710 m || multiple || 2004–2022 || 27 Jan 2022 || 63 || align=left | Alt.: 2015 KJ60 || 
|- id="2004 HM14" bgcolor=#d6d6d6
| 0 ||  || MBA-O || 16.37 || 3.0 km || multiple || 2004–2021 || 08 May 2021 || 143 || align=left | Alt.: 2010 BC75 || 
|- id="2004 HW14" bgcolor=#E9E9E9
| 0 ||  || MBA-M || 17.4 || 1.4 km || multiple || 2004–2021 || 15 Jun 2021 || 65 || align=left | Disc.: SpacewatchAdded on 11 May 2021Alt.: 2008 GU170 || 
|- id="2004 HZ14" bgcolor=#E9E9E9
| 0 ||  || MBA-M || 16.55 || 2.7 km || multiple || 1997–2021 || 03 Dec 2021 || 200 || align=left | Alt.: 2018 GT10 || 
|- id="2004 HN15" bgcolor=#E9E9E9
| 0 ||  || MBA-M || 17.52 || 1.3 km || multiple || 2004–2021 || 15 Apr 2021 || 70 || align=left | —Added on 22 July 2020 || 
|- id="2004 HT15" bgcolor=#fefefe
| 0 ||  || MBA-I || 18.5 || data-sort-value="0.59" | 590 m || multiple || 2004–2019 || 01 Oct 2019 || 37 || align=left | —Added on 22 July 2020 || 
|- id="2004 HV15" bgcolor=#d6d6d6
| 0 ||  || MBA-O || 16.2 || 3.2 km || multiple || 1993–2021 || 11 Jun 2021 || 181 || align=left | Alt.: 2010 EL165 || 
|- id="2004 HO16" bgcolor=#E9E9E9
| 0 ||  || MBA-M || 17.75 || 1.2 km || multiple || 2001–2021 || 03 May 2021 || 63 || align=left | — || 
|- id="2004 HX16" bgcolor=#E9E9E9
| 0 ||  || MBA-M || 18.01 || 1.1 km || multiple || 2004–2021 || 10 Apr 2021 || 75 || align=left | Alt.: 2008 CX151 || 
|- id="2004 HV18" bgcolor=#fefefe
| 2 ||  || MBA-I || 18.2 || data-sort-value="0.68" | 680 m || multiple || 2004–2020 || 20 Oct 2020 || 78 || align=left | Alt.: 2011 EN75 || 
|- id="2004 HX18" bgcolor=#E9E9E9
| 0 ||  || MBA-M || 16.7 || 1.9 km || multiple || 2004–2021 || 13 Jun 2021 || 170 || align=left | Alt.: 2014 SY319 || 
|- id="2004 HQ19" bgcolor=#E9E9E9
| 0 ||  || MBA-M || 17.36 || 1.4 km || multiple || 2004–2021 || 18 May 2021 || 116 || align=left | Alt.: 2013 PH72 || 
|- id="2004 HE20" bgcolor=#d6d6d6
| 0 ||  || MBA-O || 15.52 || 4.4 km || multiple || 2004–2021 || 14 Apr 2021 || 113 || align=left | Alt.: 2010 CZ52, 2010 PN40 || 
|- id="2004 HH20" bgcolor=#FFC2E0
| 7 ||  || AMO || 25.1 || data-sort-value="0.034" | 34 m || single || 9 days || 30 Apr 2004 || 44 || align=left | — || 
|- id="2004 HE21" bgcolor=#fefefe
| 0 ||  || MBA-I || 17.5 || data-sort-value="0.94" | 940 m || multiple || 2004–2020 || 19 Nov 2020 || 115 || align=left | Alt.: 2015 FR154 || 
|- id="2004 HV21" bgcolor=#E9E9E9
| 0 ||  || MBA-M || 16.93 || 2.3 km || multiple || 2001–2022 || 27 Jan 2022 || 131 || align=left | Alt.: 2006 UN213 || 
|- id="2004 HX21" bgcolor=#E9E9E9
| 0 ||  || MBA-M || 16.65 || 2.0 km || multiple || 1997–2021 || 02 May 2021 || 218 || align=left | Alt.: 2017 HW20 || 
|- id="2004 HJ22" bgcolor=#E9E9E9
| 2 ||  || MBA-M || 18.5 || data-sort-value="0.84" | 840 m || multiple || 2004–2017 || 19 Mar 2017 || 20 || align=left | — || 
|- id="2004 HN22" bgcolor=#E9E9E9
| 0 ||  || MBA-M || 17.0 || 2.2 km || multiple || 1999–2020 || 19 Nov 2020 || 86 || align=left | Alt.: 2014 OG380 || 
|- id="2004 HY22" bgcolor=#fefefe
| 2 ||  || MBA-I || 19.0 || data-sort-value="0.47" | 470 m || multiple || 2004–2019 || 21 Aug 2019 || 29 || align=left | — || 
|- id="2004 HM26" bgcolor=#E9E9E9
| 0 ||  || MBA-M || 16.8 || 2.4 km || multiple || 2004–2021 || 04 Jan 2021 || 175 || align=left | Alt.: 2013 JD9 || 
|- id="2004 HW28" bgcolor=#fefefe
| 0 ||  || MBA-I || 17.1 || 1.1 km || multiple || 2004–2020 || 17 Oct 2020 || 156 || align=left | — || 
|- id="2004 HB29" bgcolor=#E9E9E9
| 0 ||  || MBA-M || 17.69 || 1.2 km || multiple || 2004–2021 || 08 May 2021 || 86 || align=left | Alt.: 2005 SW273 || 
|- id="2004 HF29" bgcolor=#fefefe
| 1 ||  || MBA-I || 18.0 || data-sort-value="0.75" | 750 m || multiple || 2002–2020 || 23 Oct 2020 || 55 || align=left | Alt.: 2015 HV98 || 
|- id="2004 HB30" bgcolor=#E9E9E9
| 0 ||  || MBA-M || 17.5 || 1.3 km || multiple || 2004–2021 || 16 Jan 2021 || 51 || align=left | — || 
|- id="2004 HS30" bgcolor=#fefefe
| 0 ||  || MBA-I || 18.2 || data-sort-value="0.68" | 680 m || multiple || 2004–2021 || 17 Jan 2021 || 109 || align=left | Alt.: 2004 GF36 || 
|- id="2004 HD31" bgcolor=#E9E9E9
| 1 ||  || MBA-M || 18.68 || data-sort-value="0.77" | 770 m || multiple || 2004–2021 || 31 May 2021 || 37 || align=left | Disc.: SpacewatchAdded on 17 June 2021 || 
|- id="2004 HD32" bgcolor=#fefefe
| 0 ||  || MBA-I || 17.5 || data-sort-value="0.94" | 940 m || multiple || 2004–2020 || 08 Dec 2020 || 130 || align=left | — || 
|- id="2004 HL32" bgcolor=#d6d6d6
| 0 ||  || MBA-O || 16.58 || 2.7 km || multiple || 2004–2021 || 06 Apr 2021 || 53 || align=left | Alt.: 2010 NW2 || 
|- id="2004 HC33" bgcolor=#FFC2E0
| 6 ||  || APO || 26.0 || data-sort-value="0.022" | 22 m || single || 4 days || 27 Apr 2004 || 33 || align=left | AMO at MPC || 
|- id="2004 HH33" bgcolor=#FFC2E0
| 2 ||  || AMO || 20.8 || data-sort-value="0.25" | 250 m || multiple || 2004–2020 || 10 Apr 2020 || 101 || align=left | — || 
|- id="2004 HL33" bgcolor=#E9E9E9
| 0 ||  || MBA-M || 17.34 || 1.4 km || multiple || 2004–2021 || 07 May 2021 || 162 || align=left | Alt.: 2015 XT80 || 
|- id="2004 HG37" bgcolor=#d6d6d6
| 0 ||  || MBA-O || 16.75 || 2.5 km || multiple || 2004–2021 || 10 Jun 2021 || 40 || align=left | — || 
|- id="2004 HZ37" bgcolor=#E9E9E9
| 0 ||  || MBA-M || 17.28 || 1.9 km || multiple || 2004–2022 || 25 Jan 2022 || 110 || align=left | Alt.: 2010 KD64 || 
|- id="2004 HT38" bgcolor=#FFC2E0
| 7 ||  || AMO || 23.6 || data-sort-value="0.068" | 68 m || single || 6 days || 30 Apr 2004 || 38 || align=left | — || 
|- id="2004 HA39" bgcolor=#FFC2E0
| 3 ||  || APO || 20.9 || data-sort-value="0.23" | 230 m || single || 145 days || 16 Sep 2004 || 51 || align=left | — || 
|- id="2004 HB39" bgcolor=#FFC2E0
| 5 ||  || AMO || 22.7 || data-sort-value="0.10" | 100 m || single || 91 days || 25 Jul 2004 || 46 || align=left | — || 
|- id="2004 HC39" bgcolor=#FFC2E0
| 2 ||  || APO || 21.5 || data-sort-value="0.18" | 180 m || single || 20 days || 12 May 2004 || 125 || align=left | Potentially hazardous object || 
|- id="2004 HC40" bgcolor=#fefefe
| 0 ||  || MBA-I || 18.6 || data-sort-value="0.57" | 570 m || multiple || 1994–2018 || 14 Jun 2018 || 54 || align=left | — || 
|- id="2004 HZ41" bgcolor=#fefefe
| 0 ||  || MBA-I || 18.5 || data-sort-value="0.59" | 590 m || multiple || 1994–2019 || 26 Oct 2019 || 39 || align=left | — || 
|- id="2004 HC42" bgcolor=#d6d6d6
| 0 ||  || MBA-O || 16.9 || 2.3 km || multiple || 2004–2020 || 18 Apr 2020 || 52 || align=left | — || 
|- id="2004 HF42" bgcolor=#E9E9E9
| 0 ||  || MBA-M || 17.3 || 1.9 km || multiple || 2004–2020 || 19 Nov 2020 || 47 || align=left | — || 
|- id="2004 HN42" bgcolor=#fefefe
| 0 ||  || MBA-I || 17.6 || data-sort-value="0.90" | 900 m || multiple || 2004–2019 || 24 Oct 2019 || 118 || align=left | Alt.: 2011 FV45, 2012 SD14, 2015 OO9 || 
|- id="2004 HC46" bgcolor=#E9E9E9
| 0 ||  || MBA-M || 17.08 || 1.6 km || multiple || 2004–2021 || 09 Apr 2021 || 42 || align=left | — || 
|- id="2004 HE46" bgcolor=#E9E9E9
| 0 ||  || MBA-M || 16.5 || 2.8 km || multiple || 2004–2021 || 18 Jan 2021 || 73 || align=left | Alt.: 2017 DF116 || 
|- id="2004 HB48" bgcolor=#FA8072
| 1 ||  || MCA || 17.4 || 1.8 km || multiple || 2004–2020 || 22 May 2020 || 80 || align=left | Alt.: 2010 OM28 || 
|- id="2004 HC49" bgcolor=#E9E9E9
| 0 ||  || MBA-M || 17.2 || 1.5 km || multiple || 2001–2021 || 13 Jun 2021 || 142 || align=left | — || 
|- id="2004 HE49" bgcolor=#E9E9E9
| 1 ||  || MBA-M || 17.4 || data-sort-value="0.98" | 980 m || multiple || 2004–2020 || 31 Jan 2020 || 87 || align=left | — || 
|- id="2004 HZ49" bgcolor=#fefefe
| 0 ||  || MBA-I || 18.4 || data-sort-value="0.62" | 620 m || multiple || 2004–2018 || 23 Jan 2018 || 60 || align=left | — || 
|- id="2004 HZ52" bgcolor=#E9E9E9
| 0 ||  || MBA-M || 16.72 || 1.9 km || multiple || 2004–2021 || 01 Apr 2021 || 233 || align=left | — || 
|- id="2004 HW53" bgcolor=#FFC2E0
| 1 ||  || APO || 19.7 || data-sort-value="0.41" | 410 m || multiple || 2004–2019 || 26 Oct 2019 || 52 || align=left | — || 
|- id="2004 HX53" bgcolor=#FFC2E0
| 0 ||  || APO || 23.6 || data-sort-value="0.068" | 68 m || multiple || 2004–2017 || 04 Apr 2017 || 95 || align=left | — || 
|- id="2004 HD54" bgcolor=#E9E9E9
| 1 ||  || MBA-M || 17.0 || 1.7 km || multiple || 2004–2021 || 09 Jun 2021 || 86 || align=left | Alt.: 2015 XF471 || 
|- id="2004 HE56" bgcolor=#E9E9E9
| 1 ||  || MBA-M || 17.6 || 1.3 km || multiple || 2004–2021 || 09 Jun 2021 || 108 || align=left | Disc.: LINEARAdded on 11 May 2021Alt.: 2021 GC5 || 
|- id="2004 HR56" bgcolor=#FFC2E0
| 9 ||  || APO || 23.35 || data-sort-value="0.076" | 76 m || single || 3 days || 28 Apr 2004 || 10 || align=left | — || 
|- id="2004 HS56" bgcolor=#FFC2E0
| 6 ||  || AMO || 22.4 || data-sort-value="0.12" | 120 m || single || 9 days || 06 May 2004 || 68 || align=left | — || 
|- id="2004 HA57" bgcolor=#E9E9E9
| 1 ||  || MBA-M || 17.0 || 1.2 km || multiple || 2004–2020 || 23 Jan 2020 || 97 || align=left | — || 
|- id="2004 HK57" bgcolor=#fefefe
| 0 ||  || MBA-I || 18.4 || data-sort-value="0.62" | 620 m || multiple || 2004–2020 || 20 Oct 2020 || 70 || align=left | Alt.: 2011 GL28 || 
|- id="2004 HN57" bgcolor=#fefefe
| 0 ||  || MBA-I || 17.8 || data-sort-value="0.82" | 820 m || multiple || 2000–2020 || 14 Dec 2020 || 110 || align=left | — || 
|- id="2004 HS57" bgcolor=#fefefe
| 1 ||  || MBA-I || 19.0 || data-sort-value="0.47" | 470 m || multiple || 2004–2020 || 16 May 2020 || 52 || align=left | Alt.: 2014 ON253 || 
|- id="2004 HT58" bgcolor=#fefefe
| 0 ||  || MBA-I || 18.4 || data-sort-value="0.62" | 620 m || multiple || 2004–2021 || 18 Jan 2021 || 56 || align=left | —Added on 22 July 2020Alt.: 2011 KH25 || 
|- id="2004 HQ59" bgcolor=#fefefe
| 0 ||  || MBA-I || 18.7 || data-sort-value="0.54" | 540 m || multiple || 2004–2019 || 29 Sep 2019 || 48 || align=left | Alt.: 2004 KZ17, 2011 GD48, 2015 PK263 || 
|- id="2004 HT59" bgcolor=#FFC2E0
| 7 ||  || ATE || 27.2 || data-sort-value="0.013" | 13 m || single || 1 day || 25 Apr 2004 || 10 || align=left | — || 
|- id="2004 HT60" bgcolor=#E9E9E9
| 1 ||  || MBA-M || 17.0 || 1.2 km || multiple || 2004–2020 || 28 Jan 2020 || 48 || align=left | — || 
|- id="2004 HS61" bgcolor=#E9E9E9
| 0 ||  || MBA-M || 16.6 || 2.0 km || multiple || 2004–2021 || 07 Jun 2021 || 232 || align=left | Alt.: 2014 VO34 || 
|- id="2004 HK64" bgcolor=#E9E9E9
| 2 ||  || MBA-M || 18.28 || data-sort-value="0.93" | 930 m || multiple || 2004–2021 || 14 May 2021 || 33 || align=left | Disc.: SpacewatchAdded on 11 May 2021 || 
|- id="2004 HR64" bgcolor=#fefefe
| 0 ||  || MBA-I || 18.6 || data-sort-value="0.57" | 570 m || multiple || 2000–2019 || 07 May 2019 || 61 || align=left | — || 
|- id="2004 HZ65" bgcolor=#E9E9E9
| 0 ||  || MBA-M || 18.17 || data-sort-value="0.98" | 980 m || multiple || 2004–2021 || 11 May 2021 || 70 || align=left | — || 
|- id="2004 HC66" bgcolor=#fefefe
| 0 ||  || MBA-I || 18.3 || data-sort-value="0.65" | 650 m || multiple || 2004–2019 || 27 Oct 2019 || 53 || align=left | — || 
|- id="2004 HL66" bgcolor=#E9E9E9
| 0 ||  || MBA-M || 17.3 || 1.0 km || multiple || 2004–2020 || 23 Mar 2020 || 109 || align=left | Alt.: 2016 EG60 || 
|- id="2004 HB68" bgcolor=#fefefe
| 0 ||  || MBA-I || 18.71 || data-sort-value="0.54" | 540 m || multiple || 1997–2021 || 28 Jul 2021 || 71 || align=left | — || 
|- id="2004 HE68" bgcolor=#E9E9E9
| 0 ||  || MBA-M || 17.5 || 1.8 km || multiple || 1999–2020 || 10 Dec 2020 || 140 || align=left | Disc.: LPL/Spacewatch IIAdded on 21 August 2021Alt.: 2008 CF240 || 
|- id="2004 HJ69" bgcolor=#d6d6d6
| 0 ||  || MBA-O || 17.45 || 1.8 km || multiple || 1995–2021 || 26 Oct 2021 || 55 || align=left | Disc.: SpacewatchAdded on 5 November 2021Alt.: 2009 HA65 || 
|- id="2004 HL69" bgcolor=#fefefe
| 0 ||  || MBA-I || 18.4 || data-sort-value="0.62" | 620 m || multiple || 2001–2021 || 13 Feb 2021 || 77 || align=left | Disc.: SpacewatchAdded on 11 May 2021Alt.: 2011 HC30, 2020 XF17 || 
|- id="2004 HP69" bgcolor=#fefefe
| 0 ||  || MBA-I || 18.5 || data-sort-value="0.59" | 590 m || multiple || 2004–2019 || 07 Jul 2019 || 35 || align=left | Disc.: SpacewatchAdded on 17 January 2021Alt.: 2015 GG18 || 
|- id="2004 HT69" bgcolor=#d6d6d6
| 0 ||  || MBA-O || 16.29 || 3.1 km || multiple || 2004–2021 || 19 May 2021 || 116 || align=left | Alt.: 2012 UE41 || 
|- id="2004 HF70" bgcolor=#E9E9E9
| 0 ||  || MBA-M || 17.9 || 1.1 km || multiple || 2004–2021 || 08 Aug 2021 || 60 || align=left | Disc.: SpacewatchAdded on 24 December 2021 || 
|- id="2004 HH70" bgcolor=#fefefe
| 0 ||  || MBA-I || 18.2 || data-sort-value="0.68" | 680 m || multiple || 2004–2020 || 08 Dec 2020 || 96 || align=left | Alt.: 2011 FC93, 2011 GB79, 2013 WU85 || 
|- id="2004 HT70" bgcolor=#d6d6d6
| 0 ||  || MBA-O || 16.5 || 2.8 km || multiple || 1993–2021 || 11 Jun 2021 || 94 || align=left | — || 
|- id="2004 HC71" bgcolor=#fefefe
| 0 ||  || MBA-I || 18.3 || data-sort-value="0.65" | 650 m || multiple || 2004–2019 || 27 Oct 2019 || 70 || align=left | Alt.: 2011 GD94 || 
|- id="2004 HC72" bgcolor=#fefefe
| 0 ||  || MBA-I || 18.39 || data-sort-value="0.62" | 620 m || multiple || 2004–2021 || 14 Apr 2021 || 78 || align=left | —Added on 22 July 2020Alt.: 2015 OM48 || 
|- id="2004 HE72" bgcolor=#E9E9E9
| 1 ||  || MBA-M || 16.7 || 1.4 km || multiple || 2004–2020 || 17 May 2020 || 40 || align=left | — || 
|- id="2004 HD73" bgcolor=#fefefe
| 0 ||  || MBA-I || 17.9 || data-sort-value="0.78" | 780 m || multiple || 2000–2020 || 14 Sep 2020 || 107 || align=left | Alt.: 2015 FZ277 || 
|- id="2004 HH73" bgcolor=#E9E9E9
| 0 ||  || MBA-M || 17.35 || 1.4 km || multiple || 2004–2021 || 02 May 2021 || 105 || align=left | Alt.: 2014 RG10, 2016 AN28 || 
|- id="2004 HD74" bgcolor=#fefefe
| 0 ||  || MBA-I || 17.5 || data-sort-value="0.94" | 940 m || multiple || 2004–2020 || 11 Dec 2020 || 115 || align=left | Alt.: 2011 GQ20 || 
|- id="2004 HA76" bgcolor=#d6d6d6
| 0 ||  || MBA-O || 17.77 || 1.6 km || multiple || 2004–2021 || 31 Oct 2021 || 45 || align=left | — || 
|- id="2004 HU76" bgcolor=#fefefe
| 0 ||  || MBA-I || 18.93 || data-sort-value="0.49" | 490 m || multiple || 2004–2021 || 11 Jun 2021 || 40 || align=left | — || 
|- id="2004 HD77" bgcolor=#C2FFFF
| 0 ||  || JT || 14.87 || 5.9 km || multiple || 2004–2021 || 29 Nov 2021 || 53 || align=left | Disc.: Mauna Kea Obs.Added on 17 January 2021Greek camp (L4)Alt.: 2019 MS15 || 
|- id="2004 HF77" bgcolor=#d6d6d6
| 0 ||  || MBA-O || 17.6 || 1.7 km || multiple || 2004–2020 || 22 Apr 2020 || 31 || align=left | Disc.: Mauna Kea Obs.Added on 9 March 2021 || 
|- id="2004 HL77" bgcolor=#E9E9E9
| 0 ||  || MBA-M || 17.9 || 1.5 km || multiple || 2001–2019 || 26 Sep 2019 || 45 || align=left | Disc.: Mauna Kea Obs.Added on 13 September 2020Alt.: 2014 OO11 || 
|- id="2004 HU77" bgcolor=#E9E9E9
| 0 ||  || MBA-M || 17.70 || 1.6 km || multiple || 1999–2019 || 23 Aug 2019 || 53 || align=left | — || 
|- id="2004 HX78" bgcolor=#C2E0FF
| 2 ||  || TNO || 7.8 || 130 km || multiple || 2004–2019 || 06 May 2019 || 28 || align=left | LoUTNOs, plutino || 
|- id="2004 HY78" bgcolor=#C2E0FF
| 2 ||  || TNO || 8.3 || 103 km || multiple || 2004–2016 || 13 Mar 2016 || 16 || align=left | LoUTNOs, plutino || 
|- id="2004 HZ78" bgcolor=#C2E0FF
| 2 ||  || TNO || 7.3 || 164 km || multiple || 2004–2016 || 13 Mar 2016 || 21 || align=left | LoUTNOs, plutino || 
|- id="2004 HA79" bgcolor=#C2E0FF
| 3 ||  || TNO || 7.2 || 172 km || multiple || 2004–2019 || 06 Jun 2019 || 19 || align=left | LoUTNOs, plutino || 
|- id="2004 HB79" bgcolor=#C2E0FF
| 2 ||  || TNO || 8.7 || 86 km || multiple || 2004–2014 || 28 Jun 2014 || 15 || align=left | LoUTNOs, plutino || 
|- id="2004 HC79" bgcolor=#C2E0FF
| 2 ||  || TNO || 7.1 || 126 km || multiple || 2004–2016 || 29 May 2016 || 21 || align=left | LoUTNOs, cubewano (cold) || 
|- id="2004 HD79" bgcolor=#C2E0FF
| 3 ||  || TNO || 5.7 || 183 km || multiple || 2004–2013 || 10 Jun 2013 || 24 || align=left | LoUTNOs, cubewano (cold), binary: 156 km || 
|- id="2004 HE79" bgcolor=#C2E0FF
| 3 ||  || TNO || 7.3 || 115 km || multiple || 2004–2015 || 15 Apr 2015 || 19 || align=left | LoUTNOs, cubewano (cold) || 
|- id="2004 HG79" bgcolor=#C2E0FF
| 3 ||  || TNO || 6.9 || 139 km || multiple || 2004–2015 || 15 Apr 2015 || 20 || align=left | LoUTNOs, cubewano (cold) || 
|- id="2004 HH79" bgcolor=#C2E0FF
| 3 ||  || TNO || 7.0 || 204 km || multiple || 2004–2019 || 07 May 2019 || 22 || align=left | LoUTNOs, cubewano (hot) || 
|- id="2004 HK79" bgcolor=#C2E0FF
| 3 ||  || TNO || 6.9 || 98 km || multiple || 2004–2015 || 26 Apr 2015 || 22 || align=left | LoUTNOs, cubewano (cold), binary: 98 km || 
|- id="2004 HL79" bgcolor=#C2E0FF
| 3 ||  || TNO || 7.5 || 132 km || multiple || 2004–2016 || 29 May 2016 || 17 || align=left | LoUTNOs, other TNO || 
|- id="2004 HM79" bgcolor=#C2E0FF
| 3 ||  || TNO || 7.5 || 114 km || multiple || 2004–2015 || 22 May 2015 || 25 || align=left | LoUTNOs, res3:4, BR-mag: 1.29; taxonomy: BR || 
|- id="2004 HO79" bgcolor=#C2E0FF
| 2 ||  || TNO || 7.3 || 125 km || multiple || 2004–2008 || 07 May 2008 || 22 || align=left | LoUTNOs, res2:5, BR-mag: 1.52; taxonomy: IR-RR || 
|- id="2004 HP79" bgcolor=#C2E0FF
| 2 ||  || TNO || 6.6 || 173 km || multiple || 2004–2018 || 20 May 2018 || 24 || align=left | LoUTNOs, twotino || 
|- id="2004 HQ79" bgcolor=#C2E0FF
| 2 ||  || TNO || 7.8 || 104 km || multiple || 2004–2015 || 24 May 2015 || 21 || align=left | LoUTNOs, SDO || 
|- id="2004 HW79" bgcolor=#E9E9E9
| 0 ||  || MBA-M || 16.97 || 1.7 km || multiple || 2004–2021 || 03 May 2021 || 143 || align=left | — || 
|- id="2004 HA80" bgcolor=#E9E9E9
| 0 ||  || MBA-M || 17.21 || 1.1 km || multiple || 2004–2021 || 04 Aug 2021 || 125 || align=left | — || 
|- id="2004 HB80" bgcolor=#E9E9E9
| 0 ||  || MBA-M || 17.40 || 1.4 km || multiple || 2004–2021 || 03 May 2021 || 95 || align=left | — || 
|- id="2004 HD80" bgcolor=#fefefe
| 0 ||  || MBA-I || 18.41 || data-sort-value="0.62" | 620 m || multiple || 2004–2022 || 27 Jan 2022 || 117 || align=left | — || 
|- id="2004 HF80" bgcolor=#E9E9E9
| 0 ||  || MBA-M || 17.48 || data-sort-value="0.95" | 950 m || multiple || 2004–2021 || 27 Nov 2021 || 140 || align=left | — || 
|- id="2004 HG80" bgcolor=#d6d6d6
| 0 ||  || MBA-O || 16.2 || 3.2 km || multiple || 1995–2021 || 13 Jun 2021 || 149 || align=left | — || 
|- id="2004 HH80" bgcolor=#d6d6d6
| 0 ||  || MBA-O || 16.50 || 2.8 km || multiple || 1995–2021 || 07 Jul 2021 || 122 || align=left | — || 
|- id="2004 HJ80" bgcolor=#fefefe
| 0 ||  || MBA-I || 17.3 || 1.0 km || multiple || 2004–2021 || 19 Jan 2021 || 114 || align=left | — || 
|- id="2004 HM80" bgcolor=#fefefe
| 0 ||  || MBA-I || 18.6 || data-sort-value="0.57" | 570 m || multiple || 2004–2019 || 20 Dec 2019 || 66 || align=left | — || 
|- id="2004 HO80" bgcolor=#d6d6d6
| 0 ||  || MBA-O || 16.6 || 2.7 km || multiple || 1997–2020 || 21 Apr 2020 || 86 || align=left | — || 
|- id="2004 HP80" bgcolor=#E9E9E9
| 0 ||  || MBA-M || 17.4 || 1.8 km || multiple || 2004–2020 || 15 Dec 2020 || 81 || align=left | — || 
|- id="2004 HQ80" bgcolor=#fefefe
| 0 ||  || MBA-I || 18.31 || data-sort-value="0.65" | 650 m || multiple || 2004–2021 || 09 Jul 2021 || 99 || align=left | — || 
|- id="2004 HR80" bgcolor=#E9E9E9
| 0 ||  || MBA-M || 17.45 || 1.4 km || multiple || 2004–2021 || 08 May 2021 || 135 || align=left | — || 
|- id="2004 HU80" bgcolor=#fefefe
| 0 ||  || MBA-I || 17.9 || data-sort-value="0.78" | 780 m || multiple || 2004–2020 || 10 Dec 2020 || 87 || align=left | — || 
|- id="2004 HV80" bgcolor=#fefefe
| 1 ||  || HUN || 19.3 || data-sort-value="0.41" | 410 m || multiple || 2004–2020 || 19 Nov 2020 || 69 || align=left | — || 
|- id="2004 HW80" bgcolor=#fefefe
| 0 ||  || MBA-I || 18.21 || data-sort-value="0.68" | 680 m || multiple || 2004–2021 || 14 Apr 2021 || 75 || align=left | — || 
|- id="2004 HX80" bgcolor=#fefefe
| 0 ||  || MBA-I || 18.0 || data-sort-value="0.75" | 750 m || multiple || 2004–2020 || 17 Nov 2020 || 71 || align=left | — || 
|- id="2004 HY80" bgcolor=#E9E9E9
| 0 ||  || MBA-M || 17.94 || 1.1 km || multiple || 2004–2021 || 31 Mar 2021 || 69 || align=left | — || 
|- id="2004 HZ80" bgcolor=#fefefe
| 0 ||  || MBA-I || 17.7 || data-sort-value="0.86" | 860 m || multiple || 2004–2020 || 22 Nov 2020 || 77 || align=left | — || 
|- id="2004 HD81" bgcolor=#E9E9E9
| 0 ||  || MBA-M || 17.64 || data-sort-value="0.88" | 880 m || multiple || 2004–2021 || 09 Jul 2021 || 114 || align=left | Alt.: 2016 BT66 || 
|- id="2004 HE81" bgcolor=#E9E9E9
| 0 ||  || MBA-M || 17.1 || 2.1 km || multiple || 2004–2020 || 07 Dec 2020 || 83 || align=left | Alt.: 2008 DX71, 2010 MK22 || 
|- id="2004 HF81" bgcolor=#fefefe
| 0 ||  || MBA-I || 18.2 || data-sort-value="0.68" | 680 m || multiple || 2004–2019 || 20 Dec 2019 || 64 || align=left | — || 
|- id="2004 HG81" bgcolor=#fefefe
| 0 ||  || MBA-I || 18.0 || data-sort-value="0.75" | 750 m || multiple || 2004–2019 || 30 Jul 2019 || 54 || align=left | — || 
|- id="2004 HK81" bgcolor=#E9E9E9
| 0 ||  || MBA-M || 17.52 || 1.3 km || multiple || 2004–2021 || 02 Apr 2021 || 119 || align=left | — || 
|- id="2004 HL81" bgcolor=#E9E9E9
| 0 ||  || MBA-M || 17.6 || data-sort-value="0.90" | 900 m || multiple || 2004–2020 || 26 Jan 2020 || 52 || align=left | — || 
|- id="2004 HO81" bgcolor=#fefefe
| 0 ||  || MBA-I || 18.35 || data-sort-value="0.64" | 640 m || multiple || 2004–2021 || 01 Nov 2021 || 93 || align=left | — || 
|- id="2004 HP81" bgcolor=#fefefe
| 0 ||  || MBA-I || 17.8 || data-sort-value="0.82" | 820 m || multiple || 2004–2020 || 21 Dec 2020 || 68 || align=left | — || 
|- id="2004 HQ81" bgcolor=#E9E9E9
| 0 ||  || MBA-M || 17.18 || 1.5 km || multiple || 2004–2021 || 08 Jul 2021 || 64 || align=left | — || 
|- id="2004 HR81" bgcolor=#fefefe
| 0 ||  || MBA-I || 18.6 || data-sort-value="0.57" | 570 m || multiple || 2004–2018 || 14 Sep 2018 || 58 || align=left | — || 
|- id="2004 HS81" bgcolor=#fefefe
| 0 ||  || MBA-I || 18.6 || data-sort-value="0.57" | 570 m || multiple || 2004–2018 || 18 Aug 2018 || 45 || align=left | — || 
|- id="2004 HV81" bgcolor=#fefefe
| 0 ||  || MBA-I || 17.9 || data-sort-value="0.78" | 780 m || multiple || 1993–2019 || 25 Sep 2019 || 51 || align=left | — || 
|- id="2004 HW81" bgcolor=#d6d6d6
| 0 ||  || MBA-O || 16.69 || 2.6 km || multiple || 2004–2021 || 10 May 2021 || 95 || align=left | — || 
|- id="2004 HX81" bgcolor=#d6d6d6
| 0 ||  || MBA-O || 17.05 || 2.2 km || multiple || 2004–2021 || 06 Nov 2021 || 74 || align=left | — || 
|- id="2004 HY81" bgcolor=#E9E9E9
| 0 ||  || MBA-M || 17.7 || 1.2 km || multiple || 2004–2019 || 26 Nov 2019 || 49 || align=left | — || 
|- id="2004 HZ81" bgcolor=#fefefe
| 0 ||  || MBA-I || 19.2 || data-sort-value="0.43" | 430 m || multiple || 2004–2017 || 24 Aug 2017 || 44 || align=left | — || 
|- id="2004 HA82" bgcolor=#E9E9E9
| 0 ||  || MBA-M || 17.43 || 1.4 km || multiple || 2004–2021 || 10 Apr 2021 || 102 || align=left | — || 
|- id="2004 HB82" bgcolor=#E9E9E9
| 0 ||  || MBA-M || 17.79 || 1.2 km || multiple || 2004–2021 || 03 May 2021 || 74 || align=left | — || 
|- id="2004 HC82" bgcolor=#E9E9E9
| 0 ||  || MBA-M || 17.57 || 1.3 km || multiple || 2004–2021 || 11 May 2021 || 62 || align=left | — || 
|- id="2004 HE82" bgcolor=#E9E9E9
| 2 ||  || MBA-M || 17.5 || 1.3 km || multiple || 2004–2021 || 03 Jun 2021 || 58 || align=left | — || 
|- id="2004 HF82" bgcolor=#fefefe
| 0 ||  || MBA-I || 18.4 || data-sort-value="0.62" | 620 m || multiple || 2004–2020 || 13 Nov 2020 || 45 || align=left | — || 
|- id="2004 HH82" bgcolor=#E9E9E9
| 0 ||  || MBA-M || 17.5 || 1.8 km || multiple || 2004–2020 || 16 Nov 2020 || 44 || align=left | — || 
|- id="2004 HJ82" bgcolor=#fefefe
| 0 ||  || MBA-I || 17.9 || data-sort-value="0.78" | 780 m || multiple || 2004–2019 || 26 Sep 2019 || 69 || align=left | — || 
|- id="2004 HK82" bgcolor=#fefefe
| 2 ||  || MBA-I || 18.8 || data-sort-value="0.52" | 520 m || multiple || 2004–2018 || 18 Oct 2018 || 39 || align=left | — || 
|- id="2004 HM82" bgcolor=#fefefe
| 0 ||  || MBA-I || 18.2 || data-sort-value="0.68" | 680 m || multiple || 2004–2019 || 24 Aug 2019 || 55 || align=left | — || 
|- id="2004 HN82" bgcolor=#fefefe
| 0 ||  || MBA-I || 18.97 || data-sort-value="0.48" | 480 m || multiple || 2004–2021 || 01 Nov 2021 || 37 || align=left | — || 
|- id="2004 HO82" bgcolor=#fefefe
| 0 ||  || MBA-I || 18.7 || data-sort-value="0.54" | 540 m || multiple || 2004–2018 || 22 Jan 2018 || 32 || align=left | — || 
|- id="2004 HP82" bgcolor=#d6d6d6
| 0 ||  || MBA-O || 16.98 || 2.2 km || multiple || 2004–2021 || 13 Jul 2021 || 73 || align=left | — || 
|- id="2004 HQ82" bgcolor=#fefefe
| 0 ||  || MBA-I || 19.25 || data-sort-value="0.42" | 420 m || multiple || 2004–2021 || 03 Aug 2021 || 44 || align=left | — || 
|- id="2004 HR82" bgcolor=#fefefe
| 0 ||  || MBA-I || 18.3 || data-sort-value="0.65" | 650 m || multiple || 2004–2021 || 18 Jan 2021 || 49 || align=left | — || 
|- id="2004 HX82" bgcolor=#E9E9E9
| 0 ||  || MBA-M || 17.48 || 1.3 km || multiple || 2004–2021 || 11 May 2021 || 107 || align=left | — || 
|- id="2004 HY82" bgcolor=#fefefe
| 0 ||  || MBA-I || 18.48 || data-sort-value="0.60" | 600 m || multiple || 2004–2021 || 15 Apr 2021 || 135 || align=left | — || 
|- id="2004 HZ82" bgcolor=#fefefe
| 0 ||  || MBA-I || 18.0 || data-sort-value="0.75" | 750 m || multiple || 2004–2019 || 02 Nov 2019 || 65 || align=left | — || 
|- id="2004 HB83" bgcolor=#fefefe
| 0 ||  || MBA-I || 18.45 || data-sort-value="0.61" | 610 m || multiple || 2004–2021 || 08 Apr 2021 || 76 || align=left | — || 
|- id="2004 HD83" bgcolor=#fefefe
| 0 ||  || MBA-I || 18.4 || data-sort-value="0.62" | 620 m || multiple || 2004–2020 || 23 Oct 2020 || 65 || align=left | — || 
|- id="2004 HF83" bgcolor=#d6d6d6
| 0 ||  || MBA-O || 16.1 || 3.4 km || multiple || 2004–2021 || 08 Jun 2021 || 150 || align=left | — || 
|- id="2004 HG83" bgcolor=#E9E9E9
| 0 ||  || MBA-M || 17.34 || 1.4 km || multiple || 2004–2021 || 14 Apr 2021 || 94 || align=left | Alt.: 2010 OO91 || 
|- id="2004 HH83" bgcolor=#d6d6d6
| 0 ||  || MBA-O || 16.2 || 3.2 km || multiple || 2004–2020 || 23 May 2020 || 122 || align=left | — || 
|- id="2004 HJ83" bgcolor=#fefefe
| 0 ||  || MBA-I || 18.0 || data-sort-value="0.75" | 750 m || multiple || 1998–2021 || 17 Jan 2021 || 68 || align=left | — || 
|- id="2004 HK83" bgcolor=#fefefe
| 0 ||  || MBA-I || 17.89 || data-sort-value="0.79" | 790 m || multiple || 2004–2021 || 07 Apr 2021 || 88 || align=left | — || 
|- id="2004 HL83" bgcolor=#E9E9E9
| 0 ||  || MBA-M || 17.3 || 1.9 km || multiple || 2004–2019 || 27 Oct 2019 || 54 || align=left | — || 
|- id="2004 HM83" bgcolor=#d6d6d6
| 0 ||  || MBA-O || 16.3 || 3.1 km || multiple || 2004–2020 || 12 May 2020 || 62 || align=left | — || 
|- id="2004 HN83" bgcolor=#fefefe
| 0 ||  || MBA-I || 17.76 || data-sort-value="0.83" | 830 m || multiple || 2004–2021 || 12 May 2021 || 115 || align=left | — || 
|- id="2004 HO83" bgcolor=#E9E9E9
| 0 ||  || MBA-M || 17.32 || 1.4 km || multiple || 2004–2021 || 11 May 2021 || 96 || align=left | — || 
|- id="2004 HP83" bgcolor=#fefefe
| 0 ||  || MBA-I || 17.8 || data-sort-value="0.82" | 820 m || multiple || 2004–2020 || 19 Jan 2020 || 59 || align=left | — || 
|- id="2004 HQ83" bgcolor=#fefefe
| 0 ||  || HUN || 18.0 || data-sort-value="0.75" | 750 m || multiple || 2004–2021 || 11 Jun 2021 || 92 || align=left | — || 
|- id="2004 HR83" bgcolor=#E9E9E9
| 0 ||  || MBA-M || 17.5 || 1.8 km || multiple || 2004–2019 || 28 Oct 2019 || 46 || align=left | — || 
|- id="2004 HS83" bgcolor=#E9E9E9
| 0 ||  || MBA-M || 17.92 || 1.1 km || multiple || 2004–2021 || 15 Apr 2021 || 77 || align=left | — || 
|- id="2004 HU83" bgcolor=#fefefe
| 1 ||  || MBA-I || 18.3 || data-sort-value="0.65" | 650 m || multiple || 1998–2019 || 27 Oct 2019 || 51 || align=left | — || 
|- id="2004 HV83" bgcolor=#fefefe
| 0 ||  || MBA-I || 18.47 || data-sort-value="0.60" | 600 m || multiple || 2004–2021 || 29 Nov 2021 || 54 || align=left | — || 
|- id="2004 HW83" bgcolor=#E9E9E9
| 0 ||  || MBA-M || 17.1 || 1.6 km || multiple || 2004–2021 || 11 Jun 2021 || 116 || align=left | Alt.: 2014 SW376 || 
|- id="2004 HY83" bgcolor=#fefefe
| 2 ||  || MBA-I || 19.1 || data-sort-value="0.45" | 450 m || multiple || 2004–2020 || 23 Oct 2020 || 48 || align=left | — || 
|- id="2004 HA84" bgcolor=#d6d6d6
| 0 ||  || MBA-O || 16.9 || 2.3 km || multiple || 2004–2020 || 16 May 2020 || 80 || align=left | Alt.: 2013 VA48 || 
|- id="2004 HB84" bgcolor=#E9E9E9
| 0 ||  || MBA-M || 17.68 || 1.2 km || multiple || 2004–2021 || 06 Apr 2021 || 41 || align=left | — || 
|- id="2004 HD84" bgcolor=#fefefe
| 0 ||  || MBA-I || 18.47 || data-sort-value="0.60" | 600 m || multiple || 2004–2021 || 09 May 2021 || 43 || align=left | — || 
|- id="2004 HE84" bgcolor=#d6d6d6
| 0 ||  || MBA-O || 16.22 || 3.2 km || multiple || 2004–2021 || 31 Jul 2021 || 164 || align=left | Alt.: 2010 FD106 || 
|- id="2004 HF84" bgcolor=#E9E9E9
| 1 ||  || MBA-M || 18.2 || data-sort-value="0.96" | 960 m || multiple || 2004–2018 || 08 Aug 2018 || 28 || align=left | — || 
|- id="2004 HG84" bgcolor=#C2FFFF
| 0 ||  || JT || 14.40 || 7.3 km || multiple || 2004–2021 || 08 Nov 2021 || 195 || align=left | Greek camp (L4) || 
|- id="2004 HH84" bgcolor=#E9E9E9
| 0 ||  || MBA-M || 17.8 || 1.5 km || multiple || 2004–2020 || 05 Dec 2020 || 108 || align=left | — || 
|- id="2004 HJ84" bgcolor=#fefefe
| 0 ||  || MBA-I || 18.1 || data-sort-value="0.71" | 710 m || multiple || 1998–2020 || 17 Nov 2020 || 112 || align=left | — || 
|- id="2004 HK84" bgcolor=#fefefe
| 0 ||  || MBA-I || 18.4 || data-sort-value="0.62" | 620 m || multiple || 2001–2019 || 23 Oct 2019 || 50 || align=left | — || 
|- id="2004 HL84" bgcolor=#fefefe
| 0 ||  || MBA-I || 18.6 || data-sort-value="0.57" | 570 m || multiple || 2004–2020 || 20 Oct 2020 || 40 || align=left | — || 
|- id="2004 HM84" bgcolor=#E9E9E9
| 0 ||  || MBA-M || 18.27 || data-sort-value="0.66" | 660 m || multiple || 2004–2021 || 08 Sep 2021 || 62 || align=left | — || 
|- id="2004 HN84" bgcolor=#fefefe
| 1 ||  || MBA-I || 18.5 || data-sort-value="0.59" | 590 m || multiple || 2004–2019 || 25 Apr 2019 || 32 || align=left | — || 
|- id="2004 HP84" bgcolor=#fefefe
| 0 ||  || MBA-I || 18.8 || data-sort-value="0.52" | 520 m || multiple || 2004–2019 || 25 Jun 2019 || 29 || align=left | — || 
|- id="2004 HQ84" bgcolor=#fefefe
| 0 ||  || MBA-I || 18.4 || data-sort-value="0.62" | 620 m || multiple || 2004–2019 || 29 Sep 2019 || 35 || align=left | — || 
|- id="2004 HR84" bgcolor=#d6d6d6
| 1 ||  || MBA-O || 17.16 || 2.1 km || multiple || 2004–2021 || 18 Apr 2021 || 47 || align=left | Alt.: 2010 ED154 || 
|- id="2004 HS84" bgcolor=#E9E9E9
| 0 ||  || MBA-M || 17.80 || 1.2 km || multiple || 2004–2021 || 15 Apr 2021 || 79 || align=left | — || 
|- id="2004 HT84" bgcolor=#E9E9E9
| 0 ||  || MBA-M || 17.39 || 1.4 km || multiple || 2004–2021 || 10 Apr 2021 || 65 || align=left | — || 
|- id="2004 HU84" bgcolor=#d6d6d6
| 0 ||  || MBA-O || 17.2 || 2.0 km || multiple || 2004–2021 || 07 Jun 2021 || 62 || align=left | — || 
|- id="2004 HV84" bgcolor=#fefefe
| 0 ||  || MBA-I || 18.1 || data-sort-value="0.71" | 710 m || multiple || 2004–2021 || 17 Jan 2021 || 50 || align=left | — || 
|- id="2004 HW84" bgcolor=#d6d6d6
| 0 ||  || MBA-O || 16.6 || 2.7 km || multiple || 2004–2020 || 27 Apr 2020 || 102 || align=left | — || 
|- id="2004 HZ84" bgcolor=#fefefe
| 0 ||  || MBA-I || 18.2 || data-sort-value="0.68" | 680 m || multiple || 2004–2020 || 23 Sep 2020 || 68 || align=left | — || 
|- id="2004 HA85" bgcolor=#d6d6d6
| 0 ||  || MBA-O || 17.16 || 2.1 km || multiple || 2004–2021 || 01 Jul 2021 || 54 || align=left | — || 
|- id="2004 HB85" bgcolor=#E9E9E9
| 0 ||  || MBA-M || 17.56 || 1.3 km || multiple || 2004–2021 || 30 Jul 2021 || 91 || align=left | — || 
|- id="2004 HD85" bgcolor=#E9E9E9
| 1 ||  || MBA-M || 18.54 || data-sort-value="0.58" | 580 m || multiple || 2004–2021 || 08 Jul 2021 || 42 || align=left | — || 
|- id="2004 HE85" bgcolor=#d6d6d6
| 0 ||  || MBA-O || 16.8 || 2.4 km || multiple || 2004–2020 || 24 Jan 2020 || 38 || align=left | — || 
|- id="2004 HF85" bgcolor=#d6d6d6
| 0 ||  || MBA-O || 16.49 || 2.8 km || multiple || 2004–2021 || 04 May 2021 || 113 || align=left | —Added on 22 July 2020 || 
|- id="2004 HH85" bgcolor=#fefefe
| 0 ||  || MBA-I || 17.9 || data-sort-value="0.78" | 780 m || multiple || 2004–2020 || 17 Dec 2020 || 68 || align=left | —Added on 22 July 2020 || 
|- id="2004 HJ85" bgcolor=#fefefe
| 0 ||  || MBA-I || 19.04 || data-sort-value="0.46" | 460 m || multiple || 2004–2021 || 13 May 2021 || 32 || align=left | —Added on 22 July 2020 || 
|- id="2004 HK85" bgcolor=#fefefe
| 0 ||  || MBA-I || 18.9 || data-sort-value="0.49" | 490 m || multiple || 2004–2019 || 27 Oct 2019 || 26 || align=left | —Added on 22 July 2020 || 
|- id="2004 HL85" bgcolor=#d6d6d6
| 0 ||  || MBA-O || 16.9 || 2.3 km || multiple || 2004–2020 || 23 May 2020 || 57 || align=left | —Added on 22 July 2020 || 
|- id="2004 HO85" bgcolor=#FA8072
| 1 ||  || HUN || 19.2 || data-sort-value="0.43" | 430 m || multiple || 2004–2020 || 09 Oct 2020 || 38 || align=left | Disc.: LPL/Spacewatch IIAdded on 19 October 2020 || 
|- id="2004 HP85" bgcolor=#d6d6d6
| 0 ||  || MBA-O || 16.6 || 2.7 km || multiple || 2004–2020 || 29 Apr 2020 || 57 || align=left | Disc.: SDSSAdded on 19 October 2020 || 
|- id="2004 HQ85" bgcolor=#fefefe
| 0 ||  || MBA-I || 18.6 || data-sort-value="0.57" | 570 m || multiple || 2004–2020 || 14 Oct 2020 || 60 || align=left | Disc.: MLSAdded on 17 January 2021 || 
|- id="2004 HR85" bgcolor=#fefefe
| 0 ||  || MBA-I || 19.24 || data-sort-value="0.42" | 420 m || multiple || 2004–2021 || 08 May 2021 || 43 || align=left | Disc.: SpacewatchAdded on 17 January 2021 || 
|- id="2004 HS85" bgcolor=#fefefe
| 3 ||  || MBA-I || 18.8 || data-sort-value="0.52" | 520 m || multiple || 2004–2018 || 17 Jun 2018 || 21 || align=left | Disc.: LPL/Spacewatch IIAdded on 17 January 2021 || 
|- id="2004 HT85" bgcolor=#fefefe
| 1 ||  || MBA-I || 18.8 || data-sort-value="0.52" | 520 m || multiple || 2004–2021 || 17 Jan 2021 || 25 || align=left | Disc.: SDSSAdded on 9 March 2021 || 
|- id="2004 HU85" bgcolor=#E9E9E9
| 0 ||  || MBA-M || 17.80 || data-sort-value="0.82" | 820 m || multiple || 2004–2021 || 07 Nov 2021 || 89 || align=left | Disc.: SpacewatchAdded on 9 March 2021 || 
|- id="2004 HV85" bgcolor=#d6d6d6
| 2 ||  || MBA-O || 17.1 || 2.1 km || multiple || 2004–2020 || 23 May 2020 || 30 || align=left | Disc.: SpacewatchAdded on 11 May 2021 || 
|- id="2004 HW85" bgcolor=#d6d6d6
| 0 ||  || MBA-O || 15.7 || 4.0 km || multiple || 2004–2021 || 14 Jun 2021 || 88 || align=left | Disc.: SpacewatchAdded on 11 May 2021Alt.: 2010 FH33 || 
|- id="2004 HX85" bgcolor=#fefefe
| 1 ||  || MBA-I || 18.2 || data-sort-value="0.68" | 680 m || multiple || 2004–2021 || 11 Apr 2021 || 49 || align=left | Disc.: SpacewatchAdded on 11 May 2021 || 
|- id="2004 HY85" bgcolor=#fefefe
| 0 ||  || MBA-I || 18.82 || data-sort-value="0.51" | 510 m || multiple || 2004–2021 || 09 Jul 2021 || 74 || align=left | Disc.: SpacewatchAdded on 11 May 2021 || 
|- id="2004 HZ85" bgcolor=#fefefe
| 0 ||  || MBA-I || 18.8 || data-sort-value="0.52" | 520 m || multiple || 2004–2021 || 12 Feb 2021 || 25 || align=left | Disc.: Pan-STARRS 1Added on 17 June 2021 || 
|- id="2004 HA86" bgcolor=#fefefe
| 1 ||  || MBA-I || 18.3 || data-sort-value="0.65" | 650 m || multiple || 2004–2019 || 03 Oct 2019 || 30 || align=left | Disc.: SpacewatchAdded on 17 June 2021 || 
|- id="2004 HB86" bgcolor=#E9E9E9
| 0 ||  || MBA-M || 18.23 || data-sort-value="0.95" | 950 m || multiple || 2004–2021 || 30 Jun 2021 || 48 || align=left | Disc.: SpacewatchAdded on 21 August 2021 || 
|- id="2004 HE86" bgcolor=#d6d6d6
| 1 ||  || MBA-O || 17.0 || 2.2 km || multiple || 2004–2021 || 16 Apr 2021 || 38 || align=left | Disc.: SDSSAdded on 5 November 2021Alt.: 2010 CL46 || 
|}
back to top

References 
 

Lists of unnumbered minor planets